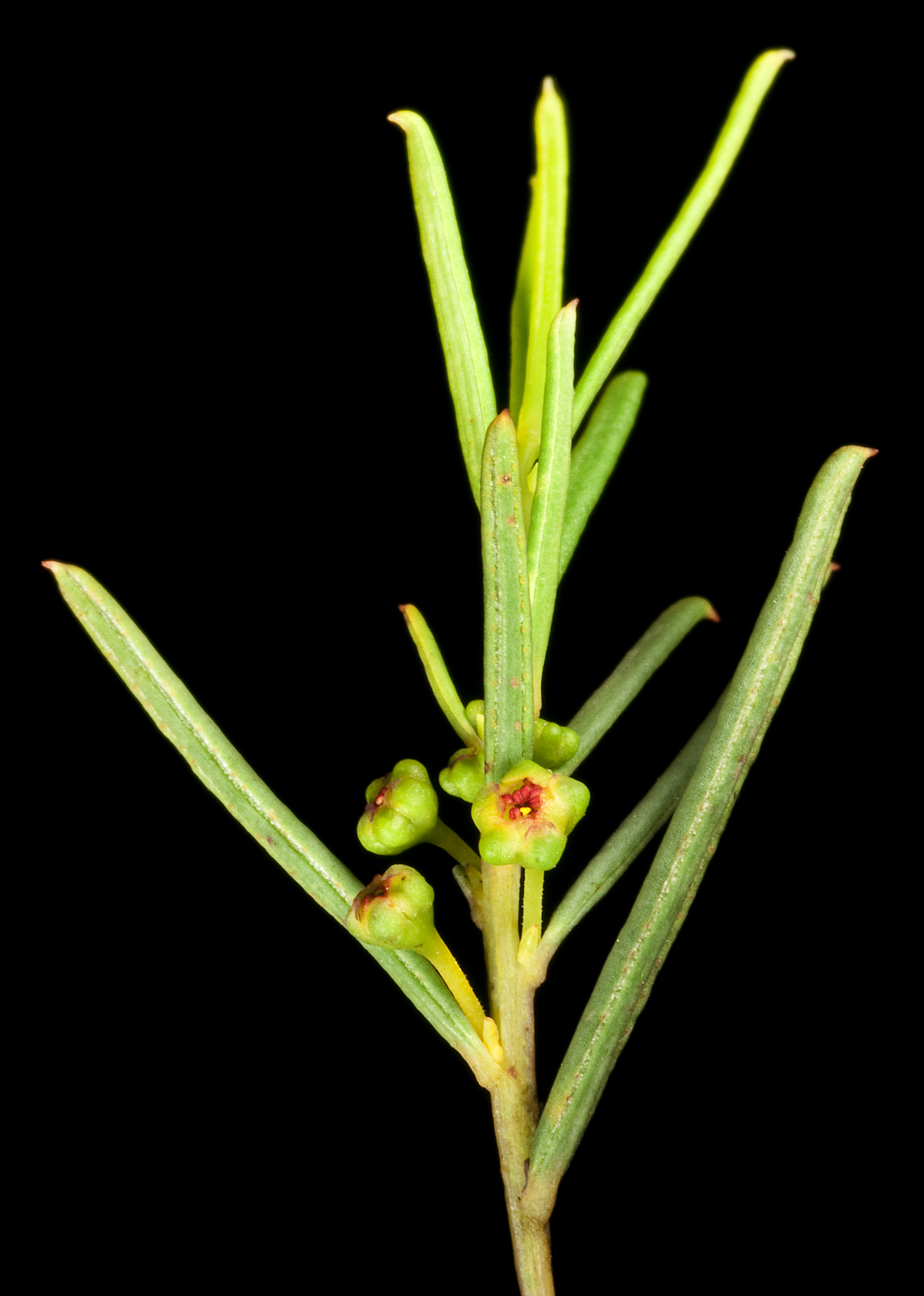
- Beyeria apiculata in Perth, Australia

Scientific classification
- Kingdom: Plantae
- Clade: Tracheophytes
- Clade: Angiosperms
- Clade: Eudicots
- Clade: Rosids
- Order: Malpighiales
- Family: Euphorbiaceae
- Subfamily: Crotonoideae
- Tribe: Ricinocarpeae
- Subtribe: Ricinocarpinae
- Genus: Beyeria; Miq.

Type species
- Beyeria viscosa (Labill.) Miq.

Synonyms
- Beyeriopsis Müll.Arg.; Calyptrostigma Klotzsch; Clavipodium Desv. ex Grüning

= Beyeria =

Turpentine bushes

Genus of flowering plants

Beyeria is a genus of shrubs and small trees in the family Euphorbiaceae known as turpentine bushes. It was first described as a genus in 1844. All species are endemic to Australia.

Species

- Beyeria apiculata Halford & R.J.F.Hend. – south-west Western Australia (WA)
- Beyeria calycina Airy Shaw – southern WA
- Beyeria cinerea (Mull.Arg.) Benth. – western WA
- Beyeria cockertonii Halford & R.J.F.Hend. – south-west WA
- Beyeria constellata Halford & R.J.F.Hend. – south-west WA
- Beyeria cyanescens (Mull.Arg.) Benth. – Dorre Island
- Beyeria disciformis Halford & R.J.F.Hend. – south-west WA
- Beyeria gardneri Airy Shaw – south-west WA
- Beyeria lanceolata Halford & R.J.F.Hend. – New South Wales (NSW), Victoria (Vic.)
- Beyeria lapidicola Halford & R.J.F.Hend. – western WA
- Beyeria lasiocarpa Mull.Arg. – Queensland (Qld), NSW, Vic.
- Beyeria latifolia Baill. – south-west WA
- Beyeria lechenaultii (DC.) Baill. – NSW, Vic., Tasmania (Tas.), South Australia (SA), WA
- Beyeria lepidopetala F.Muell. – western WA
- Beyeria minor (Airy Shaw) Halford & R.J.F.Hend. – south-west WA
- Beyeria opaca F.Muell. – NSW, Vic., SA, WA
- Beyeria physaphylla Halford & R.J.F.Hend. – southern WA
- Beyeria rostellata Halford & R.J.F.Hend. – Mt. Jackson range
- Beyeria similis (Mull.Arg.) Benth. – south-west WA
- Beyeria simplex Halford & R.J.F.Hend. – south-west WA
- Beyeria subtecta J.M.Black – Kangaroo Island
- Beyeria sulcata Halford & R.J.F.Hend. – southern WA
- Beyeria villosa Halford & R.J.F.Hend. – south-west WA
- Beyeria viscosa (Labill.) Miq. – NSW, Qld, Tas., SA, WA

formerly included

moved to other genera: Bertya Shonia

- B. bickertonensis - Shonia bickertonensis
- B. tristigma - Shonia tristigma
- B. virgata - Bertya virgata
