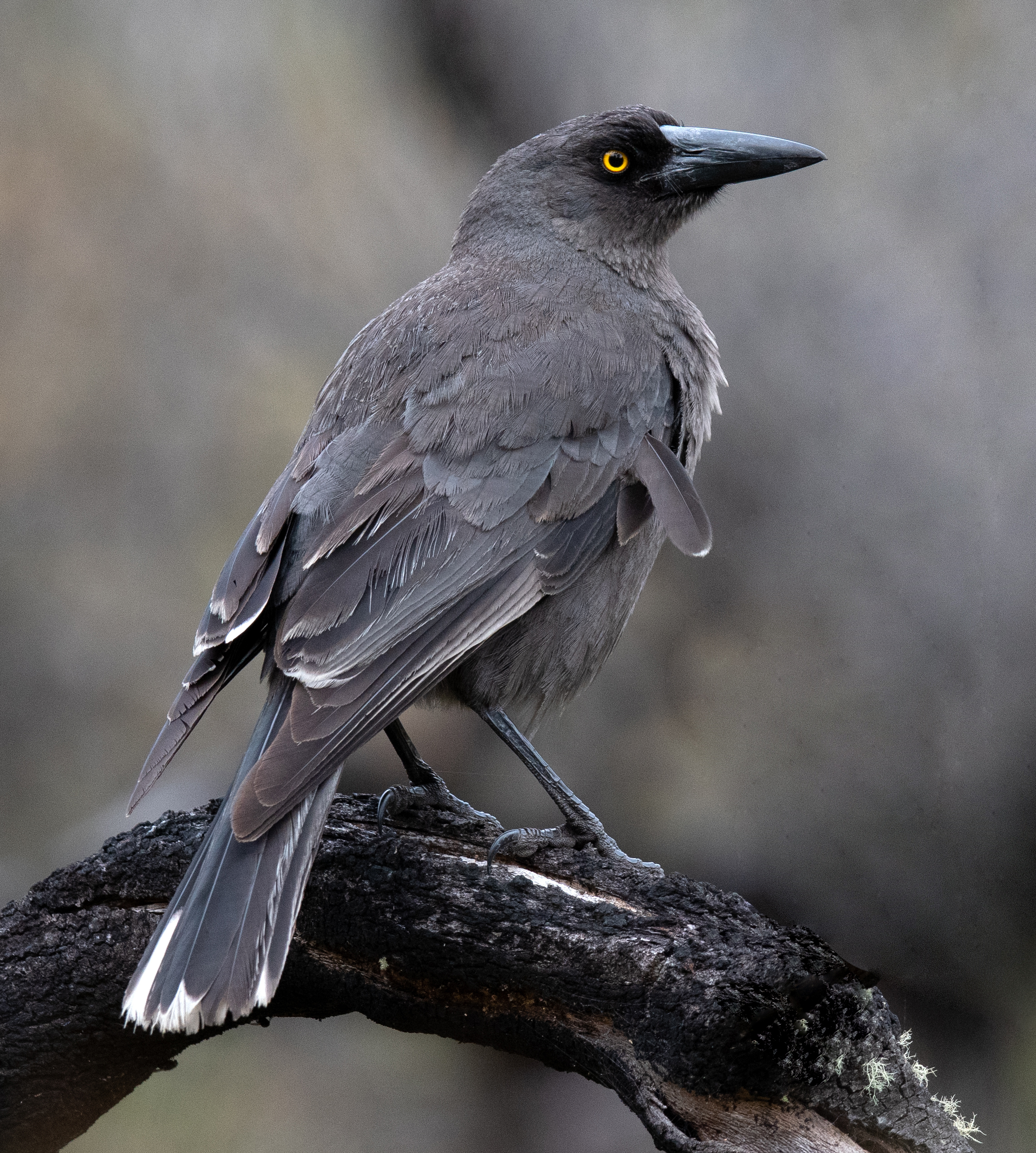
- At Perup, Western Australia
- Grey currawong call recorded in the ACT

Conservation status
- Least Concern (IUCN 3.1)

Scientific classification
- Kingdom: Animalia
- Phylum: Chordata
- Class: Aves
- Order: Passeriformes
- Family: Artamidae
- Subfamily: Cracticinae
- Genus: Strepera
- Species: S. versicolor

Binomial name
- Strepera versicolor (Latham, 1801)
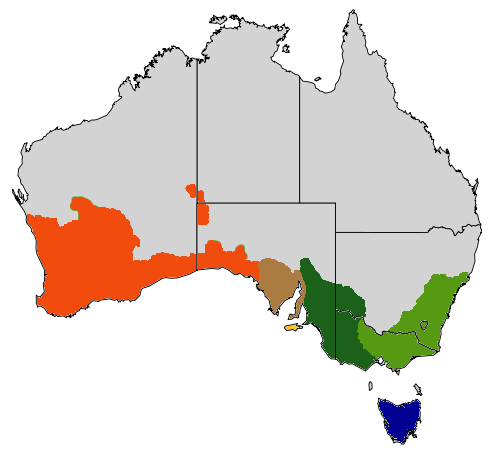
Grey currawong range
subspecies indicated
versicolor intermedia plumbea
melanoptera halmaturina arguta

= Grey currawong =

Large passerine bird native to southern Australia and Tasmania

The grey currawong (Strepera versicolor) is a large passerine bird native to southern Australia, including Tasmania. One of three currawong species in the genus Strepera, it is closely related to the butcherbirds and Australian magpie of the family Artamidae. It is a large crow-like bird, around 48 cm (19 in) long on average; with yellow irises, a heavy bill, dark plumage with white undertail and wing patches. The male and female are similar in appearance. Six subspecies are recognised and are distinguished by overall plumage colour, which ranges from slate-grey for the nominate from New South Wales and eastern Victoria and subspecies plumbea from Western Australia, to sooty black for the clinking currawong of Tasmania and subspecies halmaturina from Kangaroo Island. All grey currawongs have a loud distinctive ringing or clinking call.

Within its range, the grey currawong is generally sedentary, although it is a winter visitor in the southeastern corner of Australia. Comparatively little studied, much of its behaviour and habits is poorly known. Omnivorous, it has a diet that includes a variety of berries, invertebrates, and small vertebrates. The habitat includes all kinds of forested areas as well as scrubland in drier parts of the country. It is less arboreal than the pied currawong, spending more time foraging on the ground. It builds nests high in trees, which has limited the study of its breeding habits. Unlike its more common relative, it has adapted poorly to human impact and has declined in much of its range, although not considered endangered.

== Taxonomy and naming ==
The grey currawong was first described as Corvus versicolor by ornithologist John Latham in 1801, who gave it the common name of "variable crow". The specific name versicolor means 'of variable colours' in Latin. Other old common names include grey crow-shrike, leaden crow-shrike, mountain magpie, black-winged currawong (in western Victoria), clinking currawong (in Tasmania), and squeaker (in Western Australia). The black-winged currawong was known to the Ramindjeri people of Encounter Bay as wati-eri, the word meaning "to sneak" or "to track". Kiling-kildi was a name derived from the call used by the people of the lower Murray River.

Together with the pied currawong (S. graculina) and black currawong (S. fuliginosa), the grey currawong forms the genus Strepera. Although crow-like in appearance and habits, currawongs are only distantly related to true crows, and are instead closely related to the Australian magpie and the butcherbirds. The affinities of all three genera were recognised early on and they were placed in the family Cracticidae in 1914 by ornithologist John Albert Leach after he had studied their musculature. Ornithologists Charles Sibley and Jon Ahlquist recognised the close relationship between the woodswallows and the butcherbirds and relatives in 1985, and combined them into a Cracticini clade, which later became the family Artamidae.

=== Subspecies ===
Six subspecies are spread around Australia. They vary extensively in the colour of their plumage, from grey to sooty black, and the amount of white on their wings, and most were at one time considered separate species:

- S. v. versicolor, the nominate race, is known as the grey currawong, and is found in New South Wales, the Australian Capital Territory, and eastern and central Victoria, west to Port Phillip on the coast, and to the Grampians inland.
- S. v. intermedia, the grey-brown form of South Australia, is also known as the brown currawong. It is found in the Yorke and Eyre Peninsulas, the Gawler and Mount Lofty Ranges and the eastern areas of the Great Australian Bight. The smallest of the six subspecies, it has a shorter wing and tail. Birds in the southern Eyre Peninsula have darker plumage than those in the northern parts. First described by Richard Bowdler Sharpe in 1877 from a specimen collected in Port Lincoln, its specific name is the Latin adjective intermedia "intermediate".

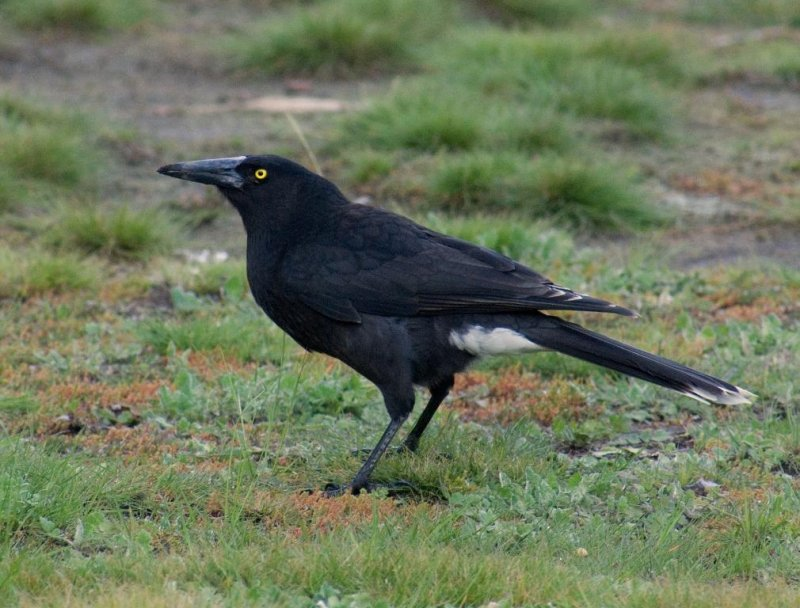
The clinking currawong of Tasmania has sooty black plumage.

- S. v. arguta, the darkest race, is from eastern Tasmania and is known as the clinking currawong from its call or locally as the black magpie. Sharpe called it the Tasmanian hill-crow. It was first described by John Gould in 1846. The specific name is the Latin adjective argūtus "shrill/piercing", "noisy" or "melodious". Larger and heavier than the nominate subspecies, it has longer wings, tail, bill, and tarsus.
- S. v. melanoptera, known as the black-winged currawong, is from western Victoria's Mallee region and South Australia west to the Mount Lofty Ranges. It can be difficult to distinguish from the black and pied currawongs at any distance. Of similar size and bill-shape to the nominate subspecies, it has a darker blackish-brown plumage and lacks the white wing markings. Birds from much of western Victoria are intermediates between this and the nominate subspecies, often bearing partial white markings on the wings. Similarly, in the western part of its range in South Australia are intermediate with subspecies to the west and also have some paler patches. Named by John Gould in 1846, its specific name is derived from the Ancient Greek words melano- "black" and pteron "wings". American ornithologist Dean Amadon observed that birds from northwestern Victoria were lighter in plumage than those of South Australia, and tentatively classified them as a separate subspecies howei. However, he noted they warranted further investigation, and subsequent authorities have not recognised the populations as separate.
- S. v. halmaturina is restricted to Kangaroo Island. A dark-plumaged subspecies, it has a longer narrower bill than the nominate race, and is lighter in weight. The specific name is the adjective halmaturina "of Kangaroo Island". It was first named by Gregory Mathews in 1912.
- S. v. plumbea is found from western South Australia and the southwestern corner of the Northern Territory westwards into Western Australia. It is colloquially known as "squeaker" from the sound of its call. Named by Gould in 1846, its specific name is the Latin adjective plumběus "leaden". The common name leaden crow-shrike refers to this group. Very similar in plumage to the nominate subspecies, it differs in its thicker, more downward curved bill. The base plumage is variable, but tends to be slightly darker and possibly more brown-tinged than the nominate subspecies. Amadon noted that a specimen from the Everard Ranges in northwestern South Australia was larger and paler than other specimens of plumbea. Although he considered these Central Australian birds as a separate subspecies centralia, he conceded very little was known. They have been considered part of plumbea subsequently.

== Description ==
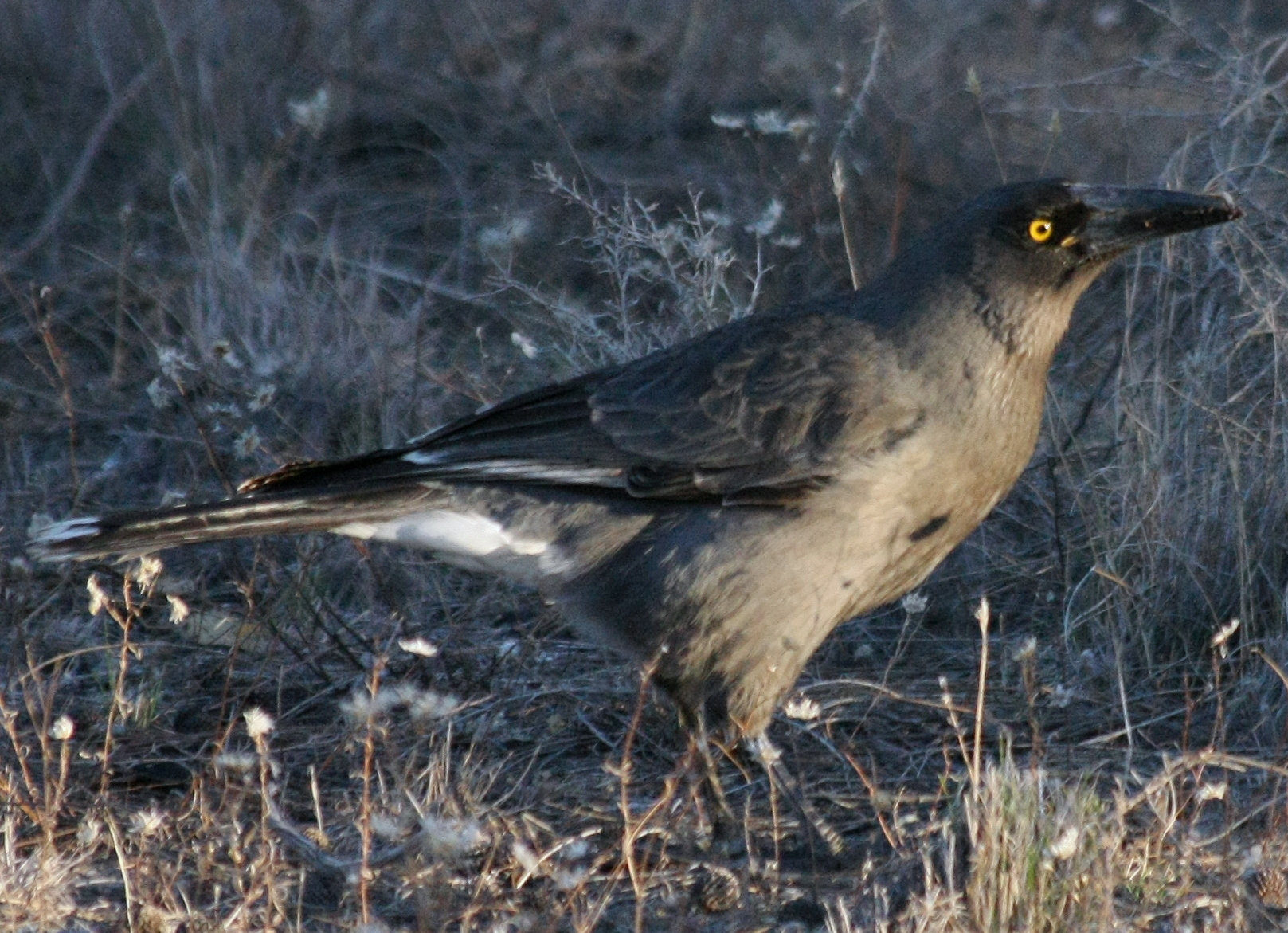
S. v. plumbea has a thicker and more downcurved bill than other subspecies.

A larger and more slender bird than its more common relative the pied currawong, the adult grey currawong ranges from 44 to 57 cm (17 to 22 in) in length, with an average of around 52 cm (20 in); the wingspan varies from 72 to 85 cm (28 to 33 in), averaging around 78 cm (31 in), with an average weight of around 350 g (12 oz). Adults of the Tasmanian subspecies average around 440 g (16 oz). The male is on average slightly larger than the female, but the size and weight ranges mostly overlap. It is generally a dark grey bird with white in the wing, undertail coverts, the base of the tail and most visibly, the tip of the tail. It has yellow eyes. The orbital (eye-ring), legs and feet are black, whereas the bill and gape range from greyish black to black. The overall plumage varies according to subspecies. The nominate race versicolor and plumbea are slate-grey in colour, while melanoptera and intermedia are blackish-brown, and arguta of Tasmania and halmaturina a sooty black. The size of the white patch on the wing also varies, being large and easily spotted in versicolor, plumbea, intermedia and arguta, but non-existent or indistinct in melanoptera and halmaturina.

More specifically, the nominate subspecies has a grey forehead, crown, nape, ear-coverts and throat with the face a darker grey-black. The feathers of the throat are longer, giving rise to hackles there. The upperparts and underparts are a brownish-grey and become more brown with age. Towards the belly, the feathers are a paler grey. The wings are grey-brown, and the blackish primaries have white edges which merge to form the prominent white wing markings.

Birds appear to moult once a year in spring or summer, although observations have been limited. Young birds spend about a year in juvenile plumage before moulting into adult plumage at around a year old. Juvenile birds have more brown-tinged and uniform plumage; the darker colour around the lores and eyes are less distinct. Their blackish bill is yellow-tipped, and the gape is yellow. Their eyes are brownish, but turn yellow early. The exact timing is unknown but likely to be around four months of age.

=== Voice ===
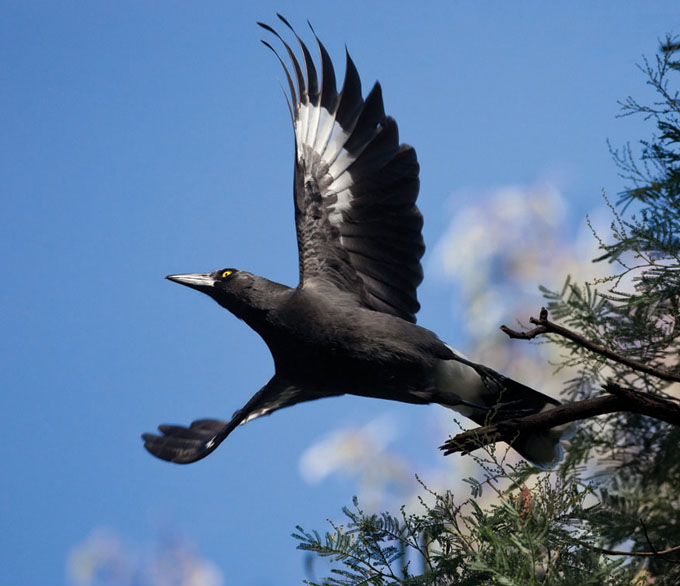
Launching from a tree in Ivanhoe in Melbourne's northern suburbs. The white markings on wings and under tail are clearly visible

Unlike that of the pied currawong, the grey currawong's call does not sound like its name. The grey currawong is best known for making a sound variously transcribed as p'rink, clink, cling, ker-link or tullock, either in flight or when gathered in any numbers. The call has been described as very loud and ringing in the Tasmanian and Kangaroo Island subspecies; Edwin Ashby wrote that in Tasmania it was akin to the squeaking of a wheelbarrow and Gregory Mathews that it was like the kling of an anvil. Elsewhere, their call has been likened to the screech of ungreased metal grinding in Victoria and South Australia (races versicolor and melanoptera are noted as similar to each other), and as a harsh squeak in Western Australia. The clinking call resembles that of the superb lyrebird, which imitates the currawong call at times.

Clinking currawong call recorded in Hobart TAS

A softer and more tuneful musical call has been called the toy-trumpet call. It has been reported to foretell rainy weather. The loud bell call resembles the clinking call, and is a clear piping sound. Females and young make an insistent repetitive squawking when begging for food from a parent or mate, similar to the begging call of the Australian magpie, and make a gobbling sound when fed.

=== Similar species ===
The grey currawong is unlikely to be confused with other species apart from other currawongs. It is immediately distinguishable from crows and ravens as they have wholly black plumage, a stockier build and white (rather than yellow) eyes. However, it can be encountered in mixed-species flocks with the pied currawong. It can be distinguished by its paler plumage, lack of white base to the tail, straighter bill, and very different vocalisations. In northwestern Victoria, the black-winged currawong (subspecies melanoptera) has a darker plumage than other grey subspecies, and is thus more similar in appearance to the pied currawong, but its wings lack the white primaries of the latter species. In Tasmania, the black currawong is similar but has a heavier bill and call similar to the pied and lacks the white rump.

== Distribution and habitat ==
Grey currawongs are found right across the southern part of Australia from the Central Coast region of New South Wales, occurring south of latitude 32°S southwards and westwards, from the vicinity of Mudgee in the north and southwest to Temora and Albury onto the Riverina and across most of Victoria and southern South Australia to the fertile south-west corner of Western Australia and the semi-arid country surrounding it. The clinking subspecies is endemic to Tasmania, where it is more common in the eastern parts, but is absent from King and Flinders Islands in Bass Strait. There is an outlying population in the arid area where the Northern Territory meets South Australia and Western Australia. In general, the grey currawong is sedentary throughout its range, although it appears to be resident in the cooler months only in south Gippsland in eastern Victoria and the far south coast of New South Wales.

The grey currawong is found in wet and dry sclerophyll forests across its range, as well as mallee scrubland, and open areas such as parks or farmland near forested areas. It also inhabits pine plantations. Preferences vary between regions; subspecies versicolor is more common in wetter forests in southeastern mainland Australia, while the Tasmanian subspecies arguta is found most commonly in lowland dry sclerophyll forest. The subspecies melanoptera and intermedia are found mainly in mallee scrublands and woodlands, while in Western Australia, subspecies plumbea is found in various forests and woodlands, such as jarrah (Eucalyptus marginata), karri (E. diversicolor), tuart (E. gomphocephala) and wandoo (E. wandoo), as well as paperbark woodlands around swampy areas, and acacia shrublands dominated by summer-scented wattle (Acacia rostellifera) and mulga (Acacia aneura) with Eremophila understory.

Formerly common, the grey currawong appears to have declined across its distribution; it became scarce in northern Victoria in the 1930s, and in northeastern Victoria in the 1960s. Habitat destruction has seen it decline in southeastern South Australia around Naracoorte and from many areas in the Western Australian Wheatbelt. It also became rare in the Margaret River and Cape Naturaliste regions after 1920, and vanished from much of the Swan Coastal Plain by the 1940s. One place which has seen an increase in numbers is the Mount Lofty Ranges in the 1960s. The species has never been common in the Sydney Basin and sightings have been uncommon and scattered since the time of John Gould in the early 19th century. The status of the species is uncertain in the Northern Territory, where it may be extinct. It has been classified as critically endangered there pending further information.

== Behaviour ==
Overall, data on the social behaviour of the grey currawong is lacking, and roosting habits are unknown. It is generally shyer and more wary than its pied relative, but has become more accustomed to people in areas of high human activity in southwest Western Australia. Its undulating flight is rapid and silent. It hops or runs when on the ground. Birds are generally encountered singly or in pairs, but may forage in groups of three to eleven birds. Up to forty birds may gather to harvest a fruit tree if one is found. The black-winged subspecies is seldom seen in groups larger than four or five, while the clinking currawong may form groups of up to forty birds over the non-breeding season.

There is some evidence of territoriality, as birds in the Wheatbelt maintain territories year-round there. The grey currawong has been recorded harassing larger birds such as the wedge-tailed eagle, square-tailed kite and Australian hobby. The species has been observed bathing by shaking its wings in water at ponds, as well as applying clay to its plumage after washing.

Two species of chewing louse have been isolated and described from grey currawongs: (Menacanthus dennisi) from subspecies halmaturina on Kangaroo Island in South Australia, and Australophilopterus strepericus from subspecies arguta near Launceston in Tasmania. A new species of spirurian nematode, Microtetrameres streperae isolated from a grey currawong at Waikerie was described in 1977. The parasitic alveolate Isospora streperae was described from a grey currawong (subspecies plumbea) from Western Australia.

=== Breeding ===
The breeding habits of the grey currawong are not well known, and the inaccessibility of its nests makes study difficult. The breeding season lasts from August to December. The grey currawong builds a large shallow nest of thin sticks lined with grass and bark high in trees; generally eucalypts are chosen. It produces a clutch of one to five (though usually two or three) rounded or tapered oval eggs, which vary in size and colour according to subspecies. Those of subspecies versicolor average 30 mm × 43 mm (1.2 in × 1.7 in) in size and are a pale brown or buff with shades of pink or wine tones, and are marked with streaks or splotches of darker brown, purple-brown, slate-grey or even blue-tinged. Those of the black-winged currawong are similarly sized at 30 mm × 41 mm (1.2 in × 1.6 in) and are buff or flesh-coloured with a purple tint and marked with darker browns or purple-browns. The clinking currawong lays larger and paler eggs of dull white, pale grey or buff with a faint wine-colour tint, and marked with darker tones of purple-, grey- or blue-tinged brown, which average 31 mm × 46 mm (1.2 in × 1.8 in). The eggs of the brown currawong are also pale wine-tinted brown, buff, or cream with darker markings of cinnamon, brown or purple-brown, and measure 29 mm × 42 mm (1.1 in × 1.7 in). Finally, the western subspecies lays eggs averaging 31 mm × 43 mm (1.2 in × 1.7 in) in size which are pale shades of red-brown or wine-colour, with darker red-brown markings. In all subspecies, the markings can coalesce over the larger end of the egg to form a darker 'cap'. The incubation period is poorly known because of the difficulty of observing nests, but one observation suggested around 23 days from laying to hatching. Like all passerines, the chicks are born naked, and blind (altricial), and remain in the nest for an extended period (nidicolous). Both parents feed the young.

Data on nesting success rates is limited; one study of 35 nests found that 28 (80%) resulted in the fledging of at least one young currawong. Causes of failure included nest collapse by gale-force winds and rain, and harassment and nest raiding by pied currawongs. The incidence of brood parasitism is uncertain. A pair of grey currawongs have been observed feeding a channel-billed cuckoo (Scythrops novaehollandiae) chick on one occasion.

=== Feeding ===
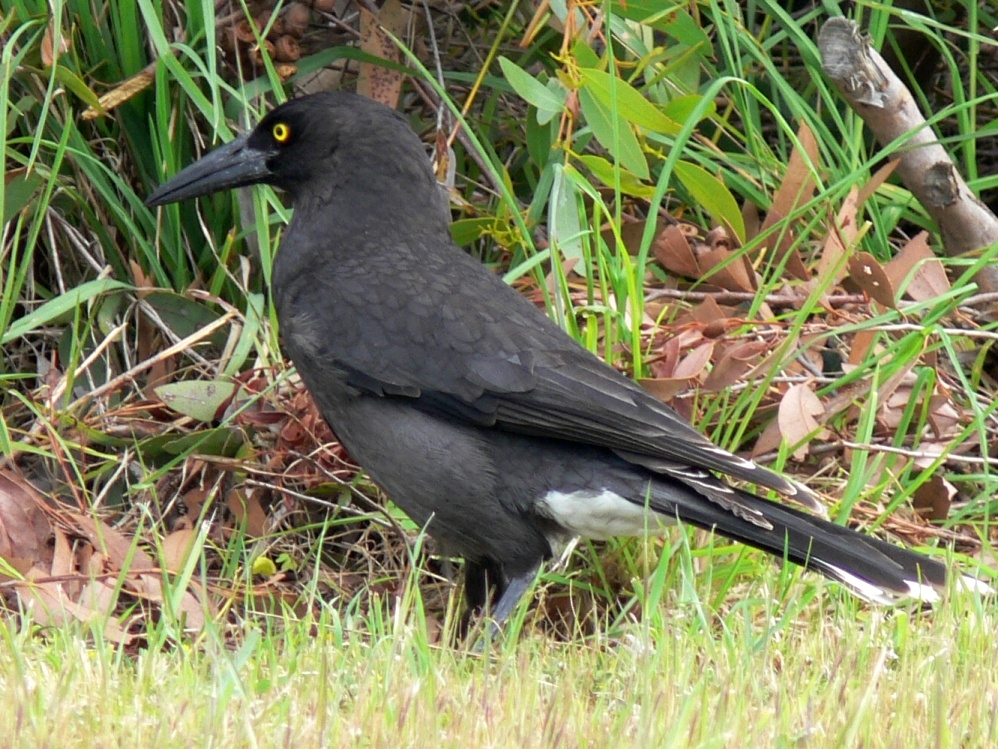
Black-winged subspecies melanoptera near Robe in southeastern South Australia. This individual has some paler feathers in its wings as it is from a population near the border with other subspecies with white wing patches and hence displays some intermediate characteristics.

The grey currawong is an omnivorous and opportunistic feeder. It preys on many invertebrates, such as snails, spiders and woodlice, and a wide variety of insects including beetles, earwigs, cockroaches, wasps, ants and grasshoppers, and smaller vertebrates, including frogs, lizards such as the bearded dragon as well as skinks, rats, mice, and nestlings or young of Tasmanian nativehen, red wattlebird, eastern spinebill, house sparrow (Passer domesticus), and splendid fairywren (M. splendens), It has been recorded hunting at the nests of the superb fairywren (Malurus cyaneus), and the bell miner (Manorina melanophrys).

A wide variety of plant material is also consumed, including the fruit or berries of Ficus species, Leucopogon species, Exocarpos species, a cycad Macrozamia riedlei, a mistletoe Lysiana exocarpi, Astroloma humifusum, A. pinifolium, Myoporum insulare, Enchylaena tomentosa and Coprosma quadrifida. The grey currawong also eats berries of introduced plants such as Pyracantha angustifolia and P. fortuneana, and Cotoneaster species, and crops such as maize, apples, pears, quince, various stone fruit of the genus Prunus, grapes, tomato, passion flowers, and the nectar of gymea lily (Doryanthes excelsa). On Kangaroo Island, the grey currawong has been identified as the main vector for the spread of bridal creeper (Asparagus asparagoides). Boneseed (Chrysanthemoides monilifera subspecies monilifera), another invasive species readily dispersed in bird droppings, is also consumed by grey currawongs. In Tasmania, A. pinifolium is especially popular, and one observer noted that the normally noisy birds became quiet and sluggish after eating it, prompting him to wonder whether the plant had a narcotic effect on the birds.

Foraging takes place on the ground, or less commonly in trees or shrubs. Most commonly the grey currawong probes the ground for prey, but sometimes chases more mobile animals. It has been recorded removing insects from parked cars, as well as employing the zirkeln method, where it inserts its bill in a crack or under a rock and uses it to lever open a wider space to hunt prey. In one case, a bird was observed holding bark off the branch of a eucalypt and levering open gaps every 4 to 5 cm (1.5 to 2 in) with its bill. The grey currawong usually swallows prey whole, although one bird was observed impaling a rodent on a stick and eating parts of it, in the manner of a butcherbird. A field study on road ecology in southwestern Australia revealed that the grey currawong is unusual in inhabiting cleared areas adjacent to roads. However, it was not recorded feeding on roadkill, and moves away from the area in breeding season. It was also commonly hit and killed by vehicles.

== Conservation status ==
The grey currawong has a very large range and thus does not meet the range size criteria for vulnerable. The population trend appears to be stable, although the population size has not been quantified, it is unlikely to approach the susceptible thresholds under the population size criterion (10,000 mature individuals with a continuing decline estimated to be >10 percent in ten years or three generations, or with a specified population structure), and the International Union for Conservation of Nature evaluated it as least concern.

== In Aboriginal mythology ==
A grey currawong features in the major Dreaming story of the Kaurna people, when the ancestor hero Tjilbruke kills one in order to use fat and feathers to cover his body before transforming himself into a glossy ibis at Rosetta Head.
