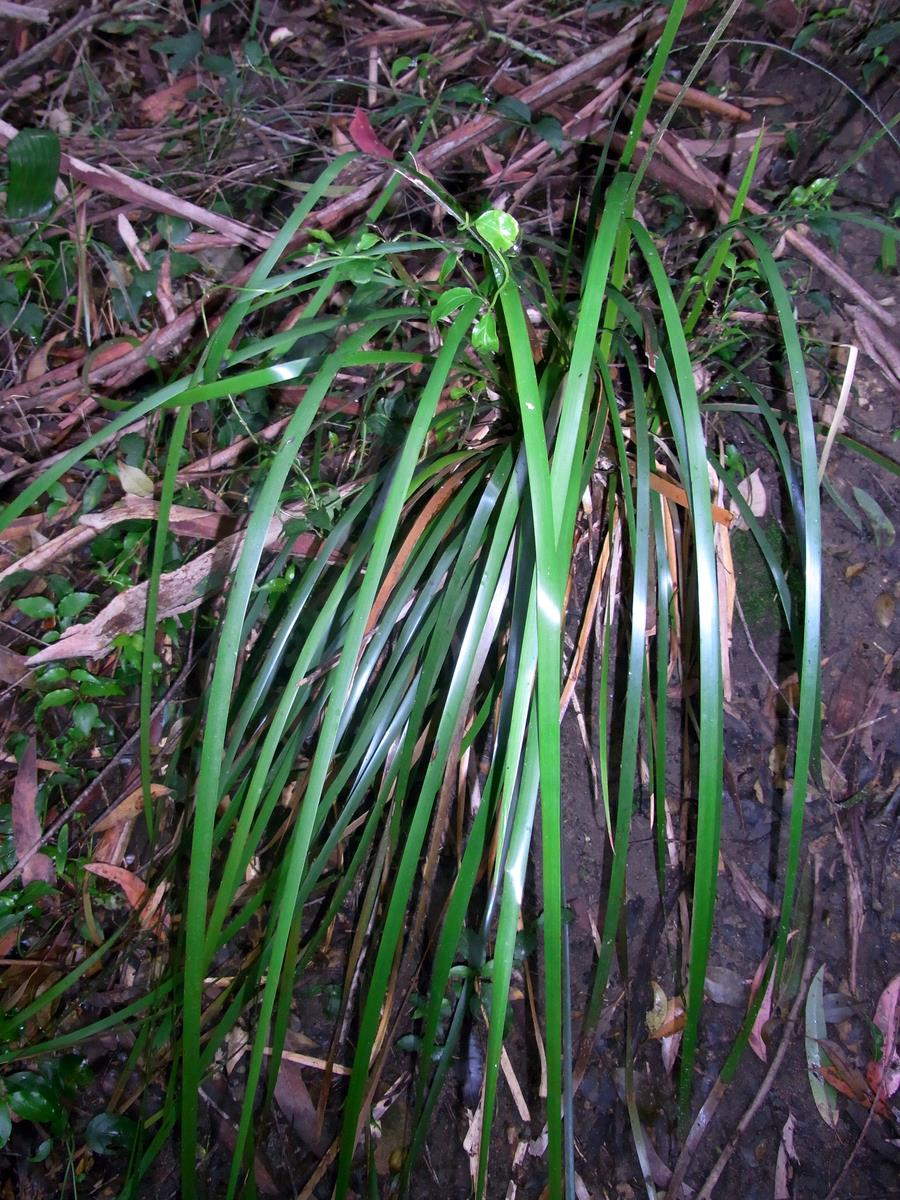
- Growing in rainforest at Chatswood West, Australia

Scientific classification
- Kingdom: Plantae
- Clade: Tracheophytes
- Clade: Angiosperms
- Clade: Monocots
- Clade: Commelinids
- Order: Poales
- Family: Cyperaceae
- Genus: Lepidosperma
- Species: L. laterale

Binomial name
- Lepidosperma laterale R.Br.
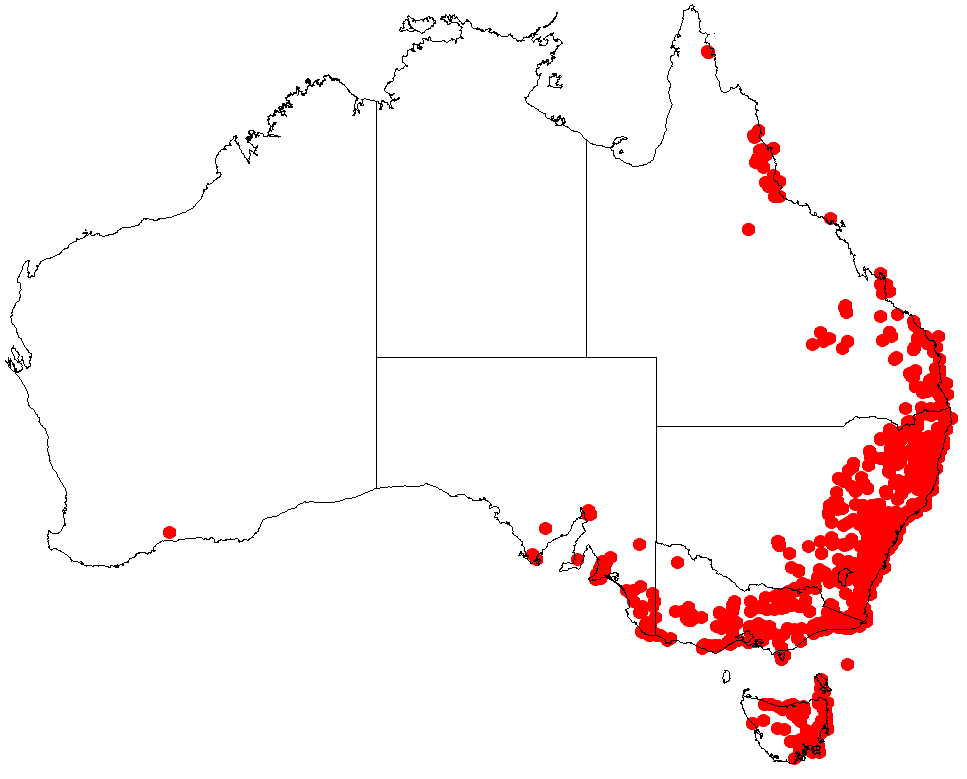
- Occurrence data from AVH

Synonyms
- Lepidosperma laterale var. angustum Benth.; Lepidosperma angustifolium Hook.f.

= Lepidosperma laterale =

Variable swordsedge

Species of plant

Lepidosperma laterale, commonly known as the variable swordsedge, is a plant found in south-eastern Australia, New Caledonia, and New Zealand. It is often found on sandy soils or rocky areas in wooded areas.

The specific epithet laterale is derived from the Latin, which refers to the sides. It is a somewhat indeterminate species, with different varieties recognized. No further formal division of this species has been made. In 1810, this species first appeared in scientific literature in the Prodromus Florae Novae Hollandiae, written by the prolific Scottish botanist Robert Brown.

The variable swordsedge can grow to one metre tall and is found in a variety of situations. However, it does not occur in the more arid parts of Australia. The leaves can be glossy, 3 to 8 mm wide. The leaf base is usually orange-reddish in colour. The flowers form on a panicle in spring and summer. The spikelets are not dense, and the secondary inflorescence branches are exposed. These can be anywhere from 4 to 20 (or rarely 38) cm in length. The fruit is an oval shaped nut, around 3 mm long and 1.8 mm in diameter, and is pale or dark brown, with either a wrinkled or smooth, and shiny surface.

The variable swordsedge ranges widely across central and eastern New South Wales as far west as Lockhart. It is a component of two riparian scrub communities in Tasmania: both are composed of ferns, sedges and heaths, one dominated by Melaleuca squarrosa and Leptospermum lanigerum, the other by Eucalyptus viminalis, E. globulus, E. obliqua and E. amygdalina with Beyeria viscosa and Exocarpos cupressiformis as understory.

Many species of the moth genus Elachista lay their eggs on Lepidosperma laterale and the caterpillars eat the leaves.
