= Beyeria Conservation Park =

Protected area in South Australia

- IUCN category IV (habitat/species management area)
- Location within South Australia
- Location: South Australia, Haines
- Nearest city: Kingscote
- Coordinates: 35°47′18.96″S 137°35′43.79″E
- Area: 1.88 km^{2} (0.73 sq mi)
- Established: 14 May 1987
- Visitors: "little use" (in 1992)
- Governing body: Department for Environment and Water

Beyeria Conservation Park is a protected area in the Australian state of South Australia located on Kangaroo Island in the gazetted locality of Haines, about 16 kilometres (9.9 miles) south of Kingscote on the northern edge of the MacGillivray Plain.

It was proclaimed on 14 May 1987, following requests to the state government by conservation groups and botanists to prevent further land clearing for agriculture in the vicinity, as well as to protect populations of rare plant species. The name of the conservation park is taken from the generic name of one of the plants so protected: the Kangaroo Island turpentine bush (Beyeria subtecta).

The conservation park has an area of 188 hectares (460 acres). It has sandy loam lateritic soils over deep clay, with gilgais in the otherwise level plain. There is a small, seasonally-filled swamp in the south-eastern corner. The vegetation association is Eucalyptus cneorifolia woodland with Melaleuca uncinata and Callistemon rugulosus in the swampy area. Apart from the turpentine bush, rare endemic plants in the reserve include Grevillea muricata, Olearia microdisca, and Caladenia ovata.

The conservation park is classified as an IUCN Category IV protected area. In 1991, it was listed on the now-defunct Register of the National Estate.
