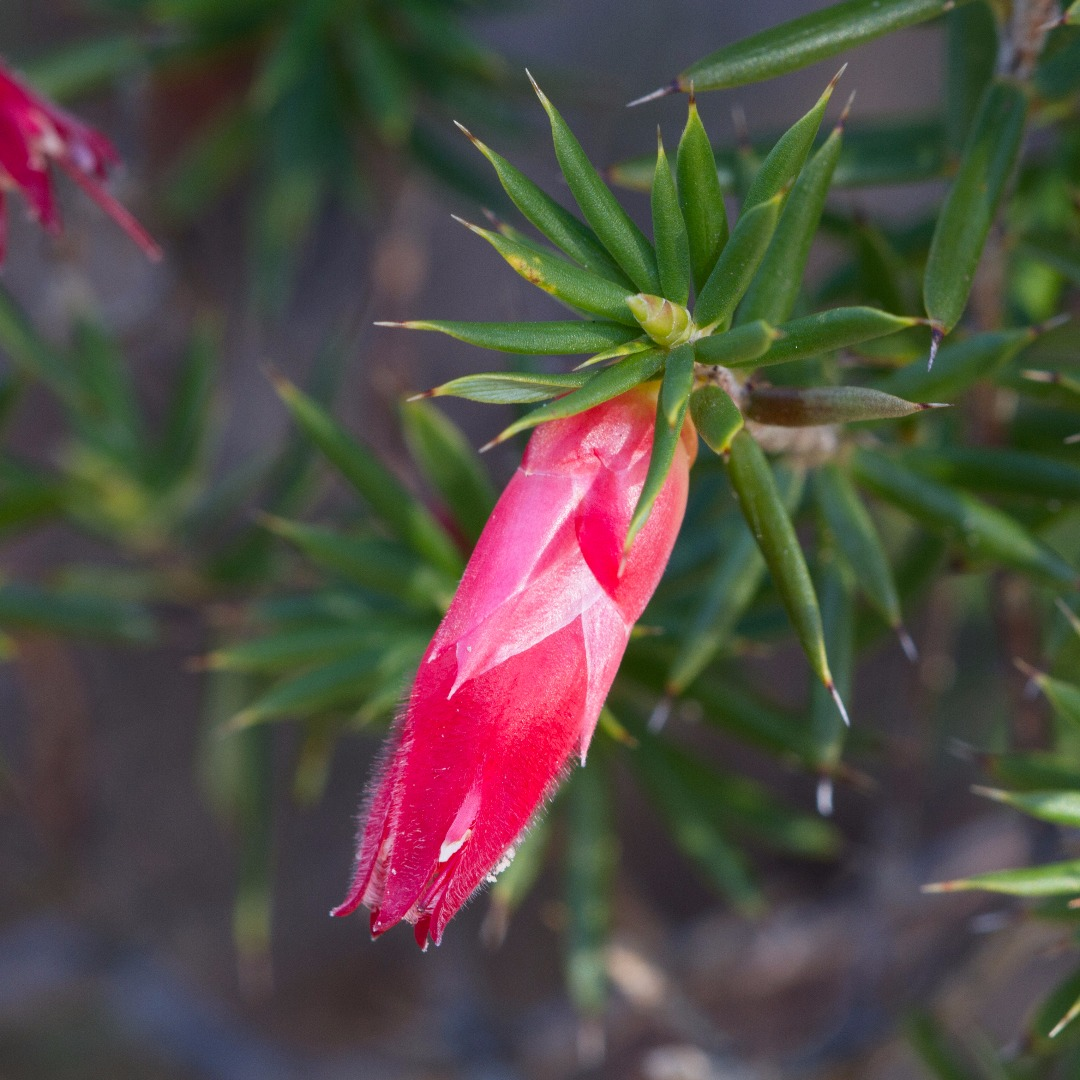
- In Monarto South, Australia

Scientific classification
- Kingdom: Plantae
- Clade: Tracheophytes
- Clade: Angiosperms
- Clade: Eudicots
- Clade: Asterids
- Order: Ericales
- Family: Ericaceae
- Genus: Stenanthera
- Species: S. conostephioides

Binomial name
- Stenanthera conostephioides Sond.

Synonyms
- Astroloma conostephioides (Sond.) F.Muell. ex Benth.; Pentataphrus behrii Schltdl.; Stenanthera conostephioides Sond. var. conostephioides; Stenanthera conostephioides var. glabrata Sond.; Stenanthera conostephoides F.Muell. orth. var.; Styphelia behrii (Schltdl.) Sleumer; Styphelia sonderi F.Muell. nom. illeg.

= Stenanthera conostephioides =

Flame heath

Species of plant

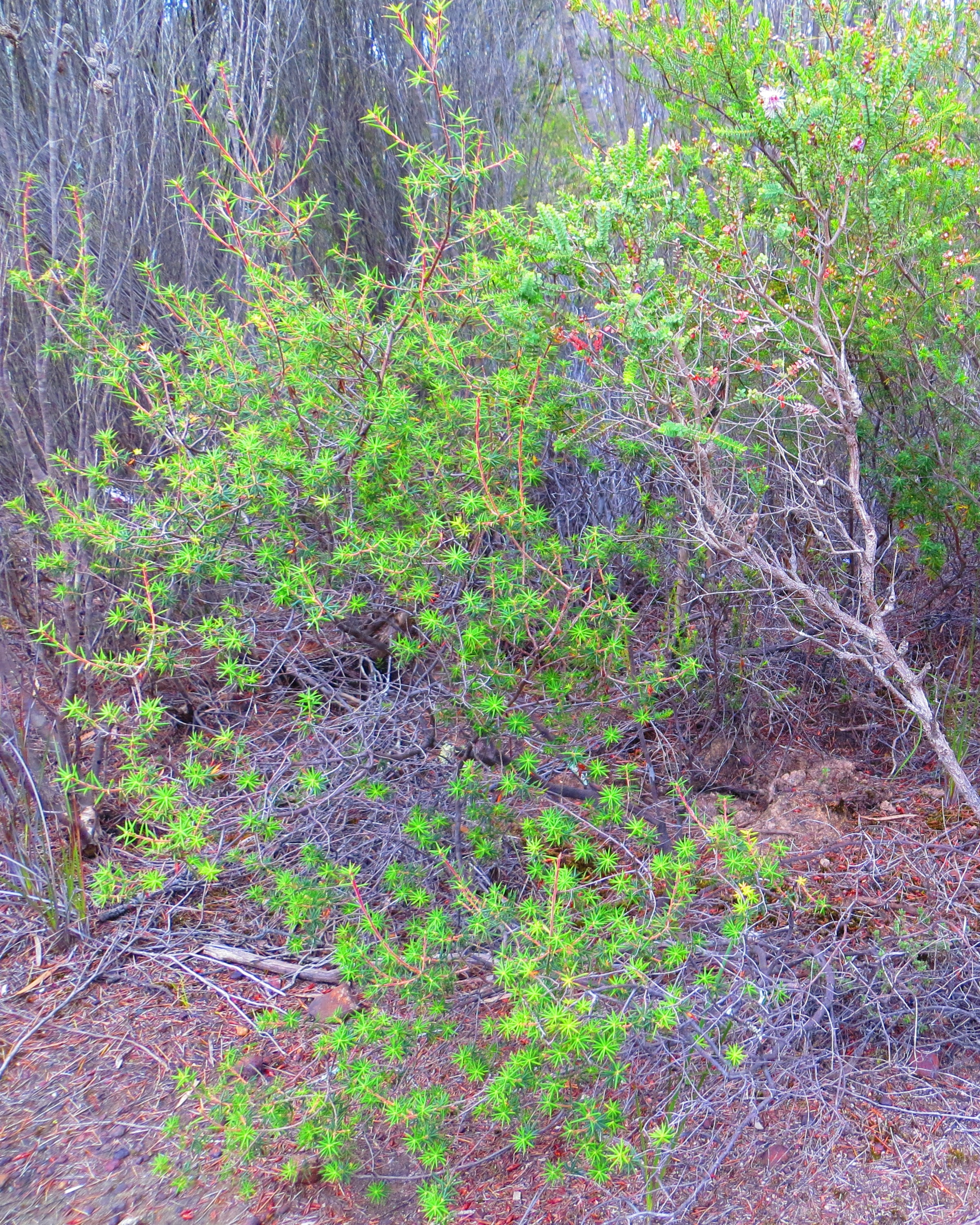
Habit in Beyeria Conservation Park, Kangaroo Island, South Australia

Stenanthera conostephioides, commonly known as flame heath, is a species of small shrub that is endemic to south-eastern continental Australia. It has linear to lance-shaped leaves, red, tubular flowers and green, oval fruit turning dark red.

== Description ==
Stenanthera conostephioides is an erect or spreading shrub that typically grows to a height of 20–100 cm (7.9–39.4 in). The leaves are thick, linear to lance-shaped, 7–21 mm (0.28–0.83 in) long and 0.8–2 mm (0.031–0.079 in) wide, with a pointed tip 1.1–1.5 mm (0.043–0.059 in) long. The flowers are red and occur singly, pendent and tube-like, more or less cylindrical and 6.3–15 mm (0.25–0.59 in) long. There are brownish bracts 0.5–10 mm (0.020–0.394 in) long and bracteoles 6.3–15 mm (0.25–0.59 in) long at the base of the flower, and the sepals are brownish 7.7–18 mm (0.30–0.71 in). The petal lobes are densely hairy on the inside near their tips. The anthers project beyond the end of the petal tube and the style is 10–19 mm (0.39–0.75 in) long. The fruit is oval, about 9–11 mm (0.35–0.43 in) long and green tinged with maroon, later dark red. Flowering occurs from March to November.

== Taxonomy and naming ==
Stenanthera conostephioides was first formally described in 1845 by Otto Wilhelm Sonder in Lehmann's Plantae Preissianae from specimens collected by Theodor Siemssen near Port Adelaide in 1839. The specific epithet (conostephioides) refers to the similarity of this species to a plant in the genus Conostephium.

== Distribution and habitat ==
Flame heath grows in mallee scrub and open forest in sandy soil. It is a common species, occurring in western Victoria and the south east of South Australia.

== Ecology ==
The flowers of this species form an important part of the diet of emus.
