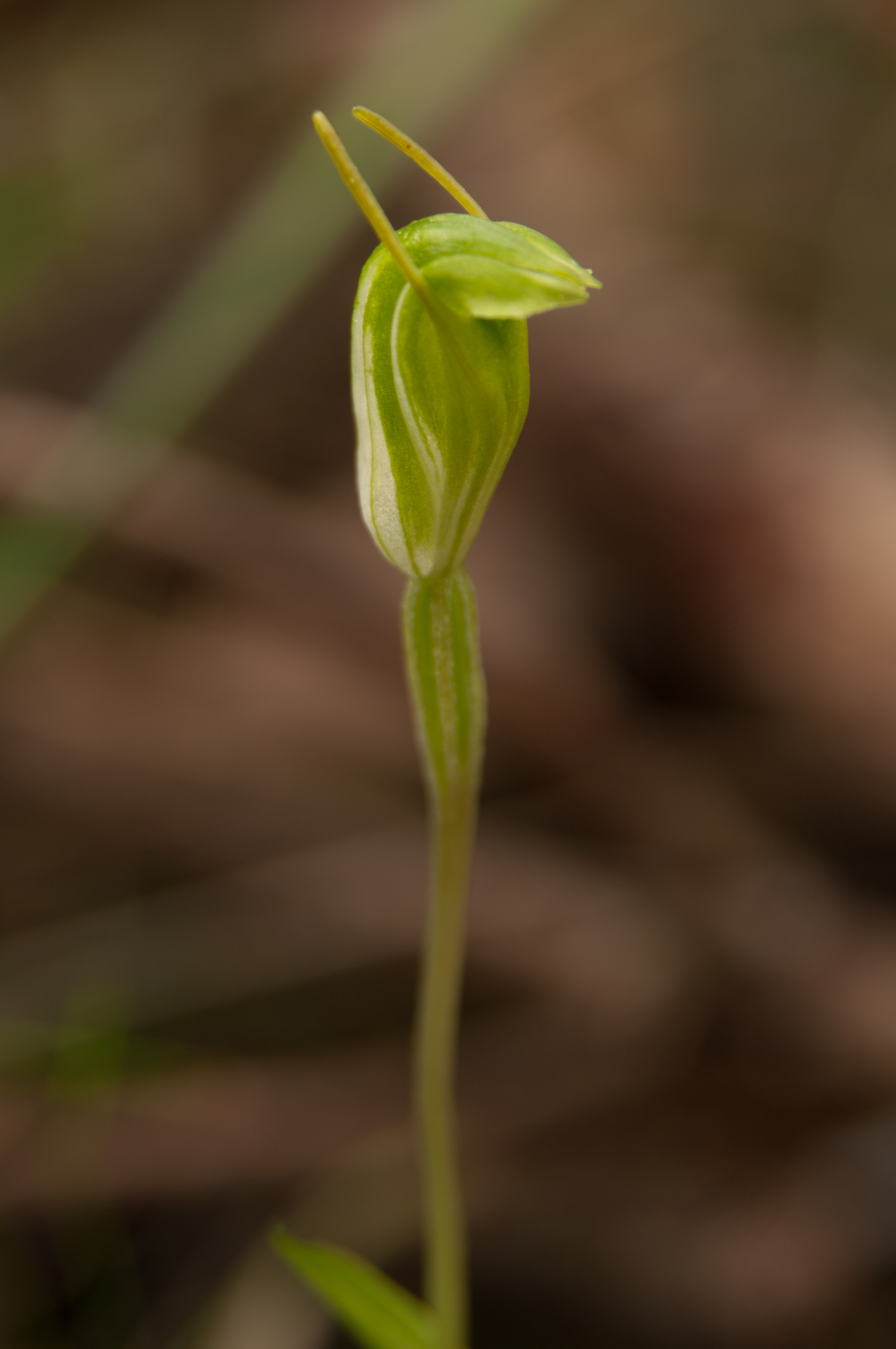

Scientific classification
- Kingdom: Plantae
- Clade: Tracheophytes
- Clade: Angiosperms
- Clade: Monocots
- Order: Asparagales
- Family: Orchidaceae
- Subfamily: Orchidoideae
- Tribe: Cranichideae
- Genus: Pterostylis
- Species: P. pyramidalis

Binomial name
- Pterostylis pyramidalis Lindl.

Synonyms
- Linguella pyramidalis (Lindl.) D.L.Jones & M.A.Clem.

= Pterostylis pyramidalis =

Species of orchid

Pterostylis pyramidalis, commonly known as the tall snail orchid or leafy snail orchid, is a species of orchid which is endemic to the south-west of Western Australia. As suggested by one of its common names, it can be distinguished from other snail orchids by its height of up to 35 cm (10 in).

== Description ==
Pterostylis pyramidalis has 3 or 4 leaves bunched near the base and 6 or 7 scattered up the flower stalk, with those near the base having a petiole (stalk) and those further up sessile (stalkless). The leaves are 8–23 mm (0.3–0.9 in) long and 8–12 mm (0.3–0.5 in). The flower stem is 10–35 cm (4–10 in) tall, tall and smooth. The flowers appear from August to October and are green and white, 16 mm–20 mm × 6 mm–8 mm (0.6 in–0.8 in × 0.2 in–0.3 in). Flowering is stimulated by summer fires.

== Taxonomy and naming ==
Pterostylis pyramidalis was first formally described by John Lindley in A Sketch of the Vegetation of the Swan River Colony in 1840. The genus Pterostylis has been reviewed by David Jones and Mark Clements who changed the name from P. pyramidalis to Linguella pyramidalis but the new name has not been widely accepted, including by the Western Australian Herbarium. The specific epithet (pyramidalis) is a Latin word meaning "pyramid-shaped".

== Distribution and habitat ==
The tall snail orchid grows on grey-black peaty sand on the margins of swamps. It sometimes forms large colonies often with the flowers partly submerged. It occurs in the Avon Wheatbelt, Esperance Plains, Jarrah Forest, Mallee, Swan Coastal Plain and Warren biogeographic regions of Western Australia.

== Conservation status ==
This species is classified as "not threatened" by the Government of Western Australia Department of Parks and Wildlife.
