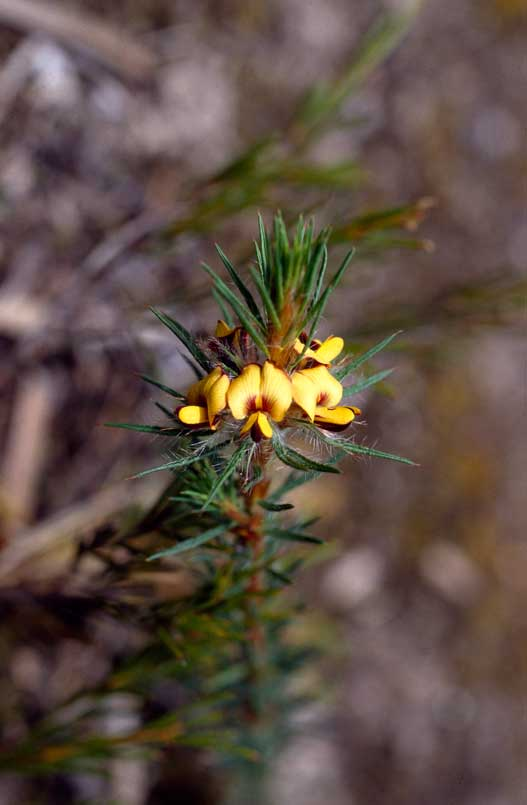
- In the Beyeria Conservation Park

Scientific classification
- Kingdom: Plantae
- Clade: Tracheophytes
- Clade: Angiosperms
- Clade: Eudicots
- Clade: Rosids
- Order: Fabales
- Family: Fabaceae
- Subfamily: Faboideae
- Genus: Pultenaea
- Species: P. penna

Binomial name
- Pultenaea penna de Kok

= Pultenaea penna =

Feather bush-pea

Species of flowering plant

Pultenaea penna, commonly known as feather bush-pea, is a species of flowering plant in the family Fabaceae and is endemic to south-eastern continental Australia. It is a rigid, spreading shrub with linear, needle-shaped leaves and yellow and red, pea-like flowers.

== Description ==
Pultenaea penna is a rigid, spreading shrub with glabrous stems. The leaves are arranged alternately along the stems, linear and needle-shaped, 5–12 mm (0.20–0.47 in) long with stipules 2–5 mm (0.079–0.197 in) long at the base, and with the edges rolled inwards. The flowers are arranged in leaf axils in tight cluster of four or five near the ends of branchlets. The sepals are hairy and 8–9 mm (0.31–0.35 in) long with densely hairy lobes. There are leaf-like, densely hairy bracteoles 6–7 mm (0.24–0.28 in) long at the base of the sepal tube. The standard petal is yellow with red markings and 8–10 mm (0.31–0.39 in) long. Flowering mainly occurs from November to December and the fruit is an egg-shaped pod.

== Taxonomy and naming ==
Pultenaea penna was first formally described in 2003 by Rogier Petrus Johannes de Kok in Australian Systematic Botany from specimens collected 20 km (12 mi) south-west of Kingscote in 1999. The specific epithet (penna) is a Latin word for "feather", "wing" or "pen".

== Distribution and habitat ==
Feather bush-pea grows in heathy woodland in the Little Desert National Park in Victoria and in the south-east of South Australia.

== Conservation status ==
This species of peas is listed as "vulnerable" in Victoria, under the Victorian Government Flora and Fauna Guarantee Act 1988.
