= Alphandia =

Scientific classification
- Kingdom: Plantae
- Clade: Tracheophytes
- Clade: Angiosperms
- Clade: Eudicots
- Clade: Rosids
- Order: Malpighiales
- Family: Euphorbiaceae
- Subfamily: Crotonoideae
- Tribe: Ricinocarpeae
- Subtribe: Ricinocarpinae
- Genus: Alphandia; Baill.

Genus of flowering plants

Alphandia is a plant genus of the family Euphorbiaceae first described as a genus in 1873. It is native to certain islands in the western Pacific (New Guinea, Vanuatu, New Caledonia).

species

1. Alphandia furfuracea Baill. - New Caledonia, Aneityum
2. Alphandia resinosa Baill. - Art Island in New Caledonia
3. Alphandia verniciflua Airy Shaw - West New Guinea
