= Beyeria subtecta =

Conservation status
- Vulnerable (EPBC Act)

Scientific classification
- Kingdom: Plantae
- Clade: Tracheophytes
- Clade: Angiosperms
- Clade: Eudicots
- Clade: Rosids
- Order: Malpighiales
- Family: Euphorbiaceae
- Genus: Beyeria
- Species: B. subtecta

Binomial name
- Beyeria subtecta J.M.Black

Species of flowering plant

Beyeria subtecta, commonly known as the Kangaroo Island turpentine bush, is a species of plant in the family Euphorbiaceae. It is a dioecious bush, growing to about 60 cm in height. Its closest relative is B. lechenaultii. It is endemic to Kangaroo Island, South Australia, and is listed as Vulnerable under Australia's EPBC Act. Beyeria Conservation Park was named after this species and was established to conserve it and other rare endemic flora.
