= Myricanthe =

Scientific classification
- Kingdom: Plantae
- Clade: Tracheophytes
- Clade: Angiosperms
- Clade: Eudicots
- Clade: Rosids
- Order: Malpighiales
- Family: Euphorbiaceae
- Subfamily: Crotonoideae
- Tribe: Ricinocarpeae
- Subtribe: Bertyinae
- Genus: Myricanthe; Airy Shaw
- Species: M. discolor

Binomial name
- Myricanthe discolor Airy Shaw

Synonyms
- Myricanthe discolor var. viridis Airy Shaw

Genus of flowering plants

Myricanthe is a genus of plants in the family Euphorbiaceae first described as a genus in 1980. It has only one known species, Myricanthe discolor, endemic to New Caledonia.
