= Stenanthera pungens =

Conservation status
- Priority Two — Poorly Known Taxa (DEC)

Scientific classification
- Kingdom: Plantae
- Clade: Tracheophytes
- Clade: Angiosperms
- Clade: Eudicots
- Clade: Asterids
- Order: Ericales
- Family: Ericaceae
- Genus: Stenanthera
- Species: S. pungens

Binomial name
- Stenanthera pungens (Keighery) Hislop

Synonyms
- Conostephium pungens Keighery

Species of shrub

Stenanthera pungens is a species of shrub that is endemic to a small area in the south-west of Western Australia. It was initially described in 2002 by Gregory John Keighery who gave it the name Conostephium pungens and published the description in the Nordic Journal of Botany. In 2016, Michael Clyde Hislop changed the name to Stenanthera pungens and the change has been accepted by the Australian Plant Census. It is only known from the type location where it grows on gypsum dunes near a salt lake east of Nyabing in the Mallee biogeographic region.

Stenanthera pungens is classified as "Priority Two" by the Western Australian Government Department of Parks and Wildlife meaning that it is poorly known and from only one or a few locations. Specimens of S. pungens have the distinction of being the 800,000th to be added to the Western Australian Herbarium.
