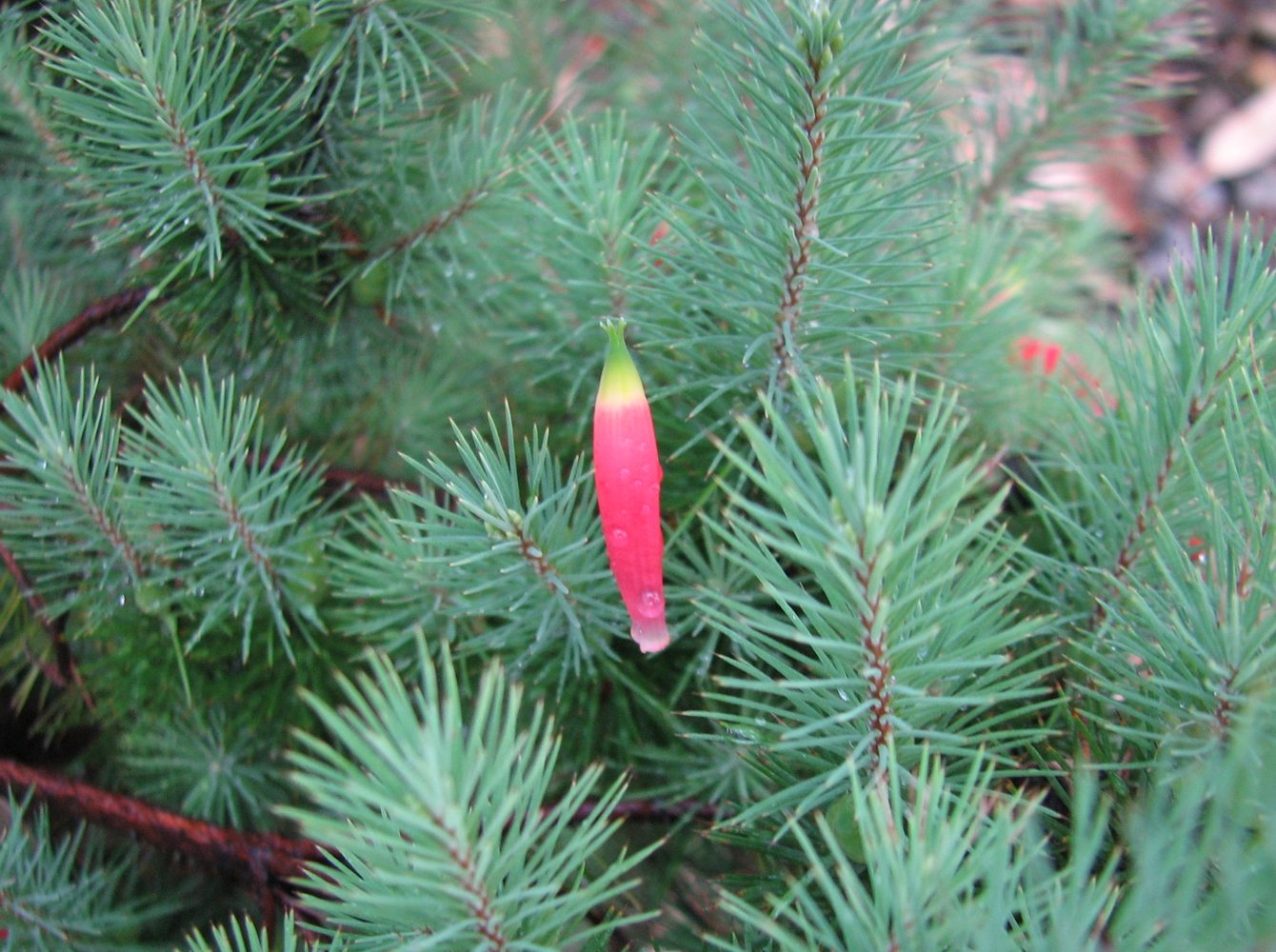
- Stenanthera pinifolia in Maranoa Gardens

Scientific classification
- Kingdom: Plantae
- Clade: Tracheophytes
- Clade: Angiosperms
- Clade: Eudicots
- Clade: Asterids
- Order: Ericales
- Family: Ericaceae
- Genus: Stenanthera; R.Br

Type species
- Stenanthera pinifolia

Synonyms
- Astroloma sect. Stenanthera (R.Br.) Benth.; Styphelia sect. Stenanthera (R.Br.) Drude

= Stenanthera =

Genus of plants

Stenanthera is a genus of flowering plants in the family Ericaceae. Most are low shrubs with leaves that are paler on the lower surface, tube-shaped flowers and with the fruit a drupe. There are three species, formerly included in the genus Astroloma.

== Description ==
Plants in the genus Stenanthera are mainly low shrubs with leaves that are paler on the lower surface where the veins are almost parallel to palmate. The flowers are borne in leaf axils and have both male and female organs. There are bracts and bracteoles and the base of the flower and the petals are joined to form a more or less cylindrical tube. The petal lobes are triangular to egg-shaped and erect or turned backwards, usually with hairs on the inner side. The anthers protrude from the petal tube but are hidden by the petal lobes. The style is thread-like and equal in length to, or longer than the petal tube. The fruit is a drupe with a hard endocarp.

== Taxonomy and naming ==
The genus Stenanthera was first formally described in 1810 by Robert Brown in Prodromus Florae Novae Hollandiae et Insulae Van Diemen. The type species is S. pinifolia. In 1868, George Bentham transferred the genus to Astroloma as Astroloma sect. Stenanthera in Flora Australiensis but following genetic studies in 2013, the genus Stenanthera was resurrected. The name of the genus comes from ancient Greek words meaning "narrow" and "flower".

== Species ==
Plants of the World Online accepts four species. Stenanthera pungens is accepted by the Australian Plant Census, and treated as a synonym of Conostephium pungens by Plants of the World Online.

- Stenanthera conostephioides Sonder – flame heath – South Australia and Victoria
- Stenanthera lacsalaria A.J.G.Wilson & Hislop – south Western Australia
- Stenanthera localis Hislop – south-southwestern Western Australia
- Stenanthera pinifolia R.Br – pine heath – New South Wales, Victoria, and Tasmania
- Stenanthera pungens (Keighery) Hislop – Western Australia

== Distribution ==
Stenanthera species are found south-western Western Australia and in south-eastern Australia.

== Use in horticulture ==
Stenantheras are difficult to grow and maintain in a garden but S. pinifolia can be propagated from cuttings and grown in well-drained soil in a semi-shaded position.
