= Cocconerion =

Scientific classification
- Kingdom: Plantae
- Clade: Tracheophytes
- Clade: Angiosperms
- Clade: Eudicots
- Clade: Rosids
- Order: Malpighiales
- Family: Euphorbiaceae
- Subfamily: Crotonoideae
- Tribe: Ricinocarpeae
- Subtribe: Bertyinae
- Genus: Cocconerion; Baill.

Genus of flowering plants

Cocconerion is a genus of plants under the family Euphorbiaceae first described as a genus in 1873. The entire genus is endemic to New Caledonia and is related to Baloghia.

Species

1. Cocconerion balansae Baill. – SE New Caledonia
2. Cocconerion minus Baill. – New Caledonia, Loyalty Islands
