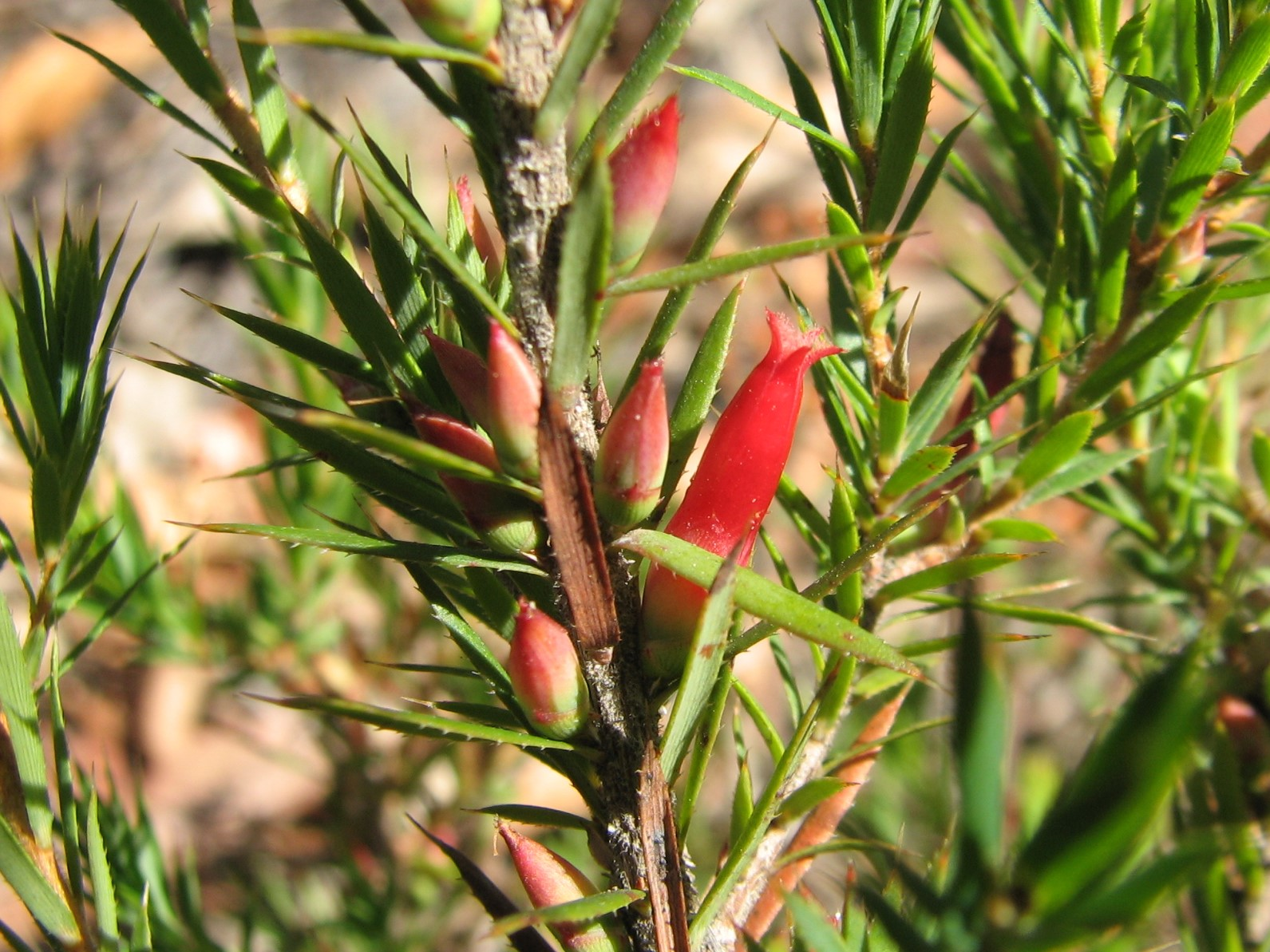

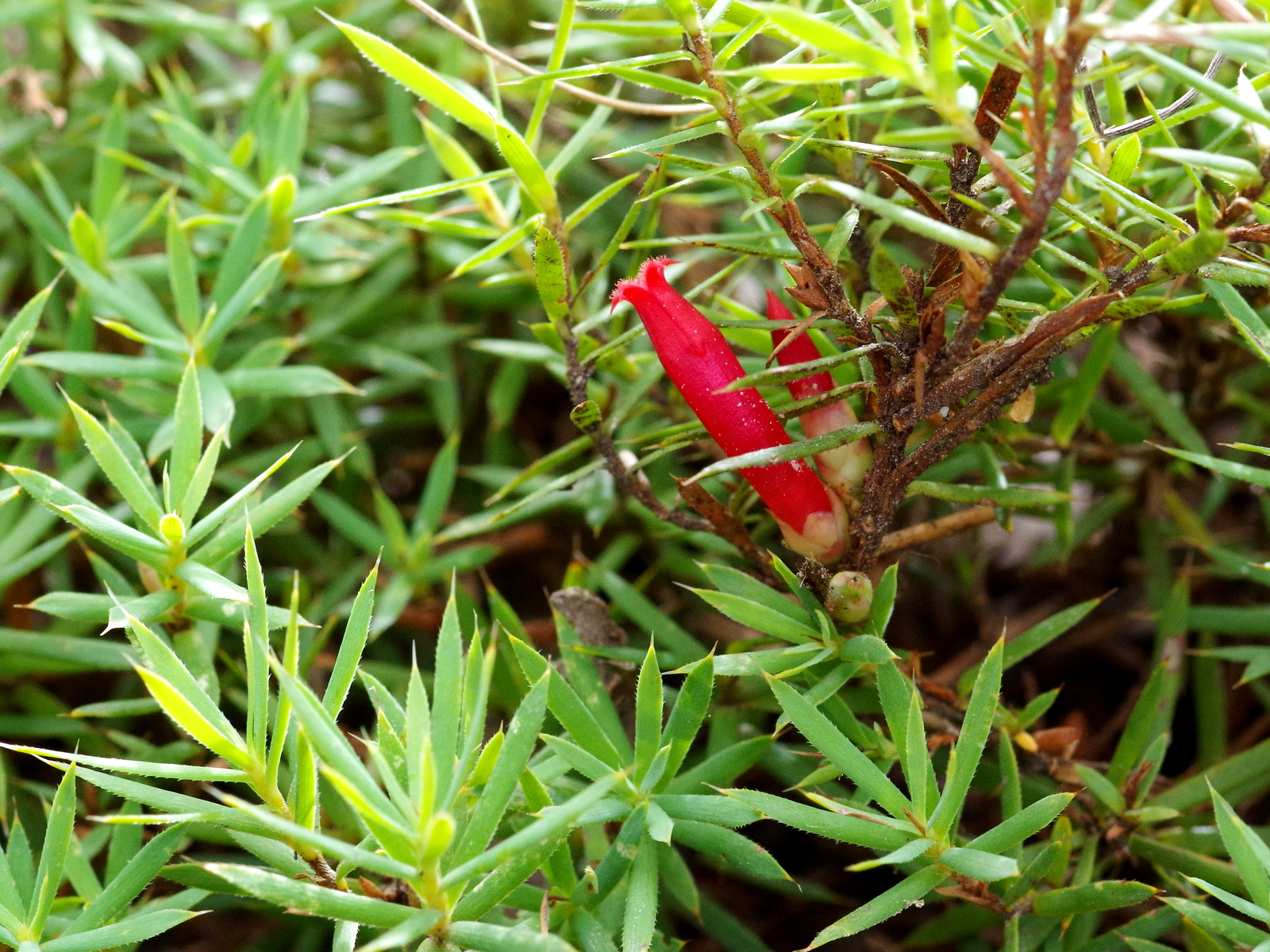

Scientific classification
- Kingdom: Plantae
- Clade: Tracheophytes
- Clade: Angiosperms
- Clade: Eudicots
- Clade: Asterids
- Order: Ericales
- Family: Ericaceae
- Genus: Styphelia
- Species: S. humifusa

Binomial name
- Styphelia humifusa (Cav.) Pers.

Synonyms
- Astroloma humifusum (Cav.) R.Br.; Ventenatia humifusa Cav.; Astroloma denticulatum R.Br.; Astroloma humifusum var. denticulatum (R.Br.) Guilf.; Styphelia denticulata Spreng.

= Styphelia humifusa =

Species of plant

Styphelia humifusa, commonly known as native cranberry or cranberry heath, is a small prostrate shrub or groundcover in the heath family Ericaceae. The species is endemic to south-eastern Australia.

== Description ==
Styphelia humifusa grows as a spreading mat-like shrub up to 50 cm (20 in) high and 0.5 to 1.5 m (20 in to 5 ft) across. Its hairy stems bear blue-green pine-like acute leaves 0.5-1.2 cm (0.2-0.5 in) long. The tubular flowers are up to 2 cm (0.8 in) long and appear from February to June, and are all red, unlike the red and green flowers of A. pinifolium. Flowers are followed by green globular berries around 0.4-0.6 cm (0.2 in) in diameter, which become reddish as they ripen.

== Taxonomy ==
Styphelia humifusa was first formally described in 1797 by Antonio José Cavanilles who gave it the name Ventenatia humifusa in his Icones et Descriptiones Plantarum. In 1805, Christiaan Hendrik Persoon transferred the species to Styphelia as S. humifusa in his book Synopsis plantarum, seu enchiridium botanicum.

=== Common names ===
Common names include cranberry heath and native cranberry, as the fruits were eaten by early settlers. An old name is juniper-leaved astroloma. A common nineteenth century name was the ground berry.

== Distribution and habitat ==
The range is in southeastern Australia, from Port Stephens in the north in eastern and central New South Wales, into Victoria, south-eastern South Australia and Tasmania. It is generally found in open woodland, both on sandstone and clay soils, as well as upland bogs. Associated plant species include Eucalyptus fibrosa, Eucalyptus sideroxylon, and Kunzea ambigua.

== Ecology ==
The eastern bettong (Bettongia gaimardi) eats the fruit.

== Uses ==
Requiring good drainage in the garden, Styphelia humifusa can be grown in rockeries. The juicy berries are edible, although they are mostly made up of a large seed. They can be used to make jams or preserves. The flavour of the berries has been described as "sickly sweet".

The 1889 book 'The Useful Native Plants of Australia records that "The fruits of these dwarf shrubs have a viscid sweetish pulp, with a relatively large stone. The pulp is described by some as being "apple flavoured..."
