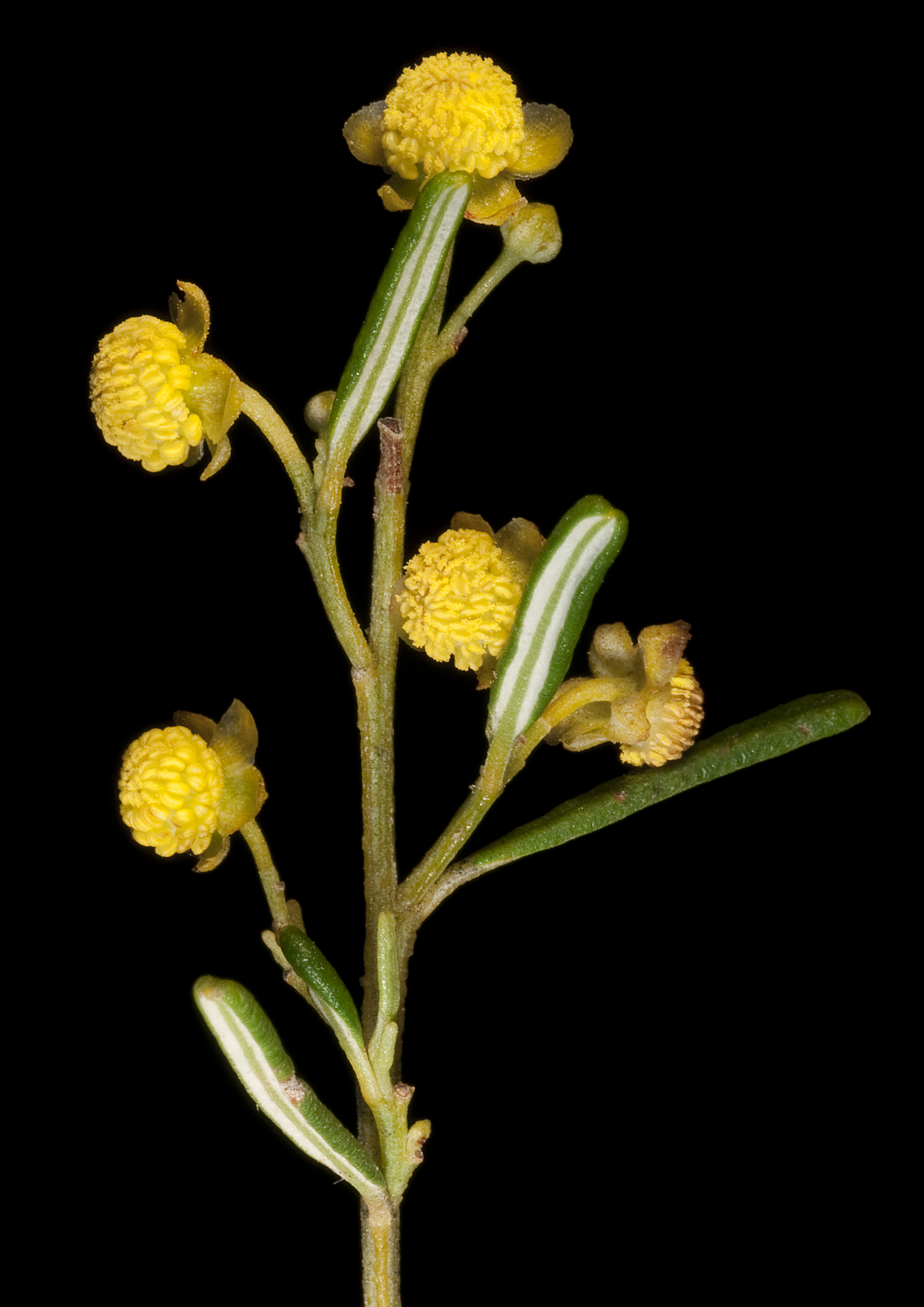
- Male flowers
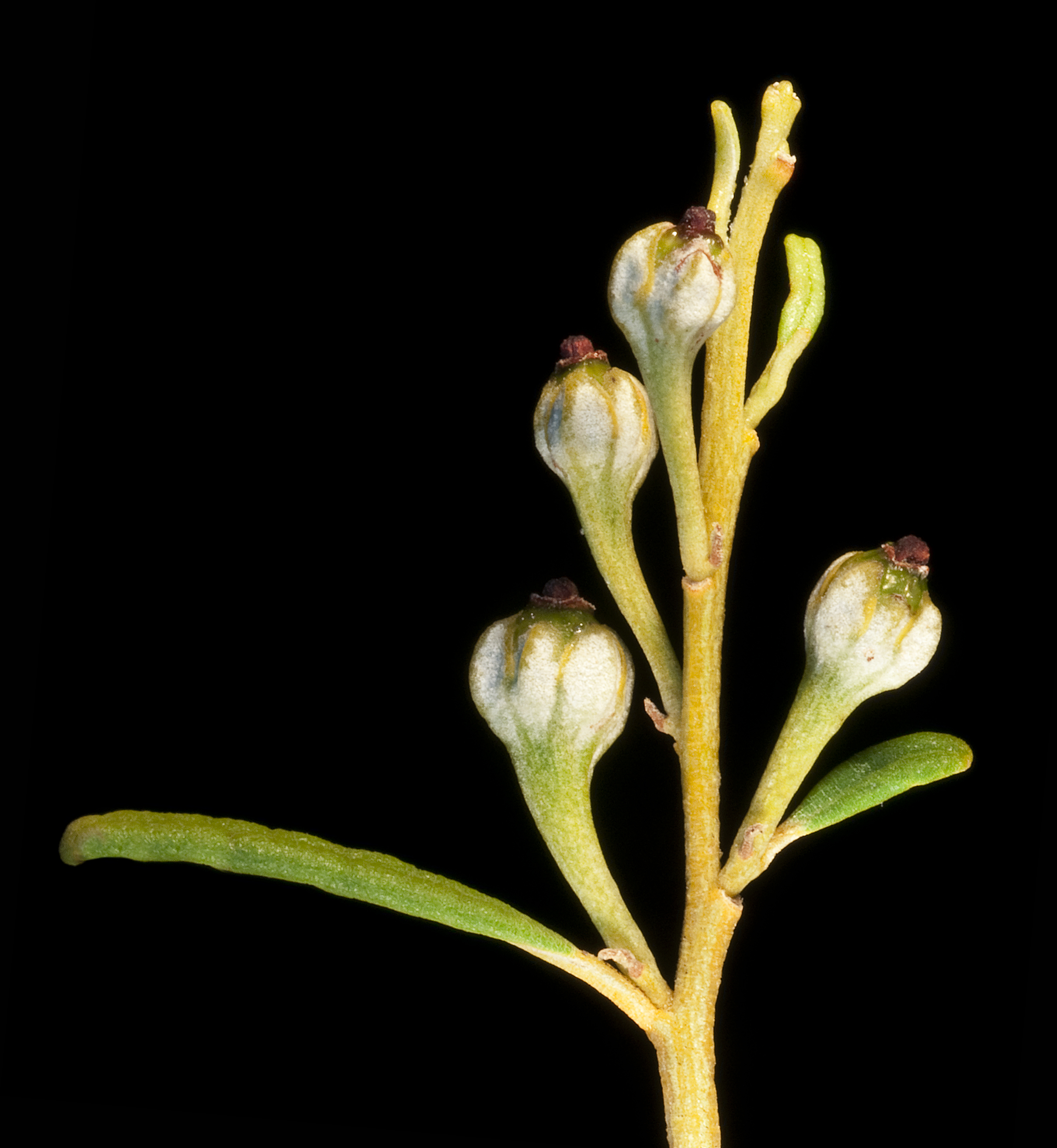
- Female flowers

Scientific classification
- Kingdom: Plantae
- Clade: Embryophytes
- Clade: Tracheophytes
- Clade: Angiosperms
- Clade: Eudicots
- Clade: Rosids
- Order: Malpighiales
- Family: Euphorbiaceae
- Genus: Beyeria
- Species: B. lechenaultii

Binomial name
- Beyeria lechenaultii (DC.) Baill.

Synonyms
- Hemistemma lechenaultii DC. Beyeria backhousei Hook.f. Beyeria drummondii F.Muell. Beyeria lechenaultii var. backhousei (Hook.f.) Grüning; Beyeria lechenaultii var. drummondii (F.Muell.) Grüning; Beyeria lechenaultii f. eloeagnoides Baill. Beyeria lechenaultii var. genuina (Baill.) Grüning; Beyeria lechenaultii var. latifolia Ewart; Beyeria lechenaultii var. latifolia Grüning; Beyeria lechenaultii var. ledifolia (Klotzsch) Grüning Beyeria lechenaultii f. myrtoides Baill. Beyeria lechenaultii f. pernettioides Baill. Beyeria lechenaultii var. rosmarinoides (Baill.) Grüning; Beyeria lechenaultii f. rosmarinoides Baill. Beyeria lechenaultii f. salsoloides Baill. Beyeria lechenaultii f. vaccinioides Baill. Beyeria ledifolia (Klotzsch) Sond. Beyeria ledifolia var. angustifolia Müll.Arg. Beyeria ledifolia var. backhousei (Hook.f.) Müll.Arg. Beyeria ledifolia var. genuina Müll.Arg. Beyeria opaca var. linearis Benth. Beyeriopsis drummondii (F.Muell.) Müll.Arg. Calyptrostigma ledifolium Klotzsch

= Beyeria lechenaultii =

Species of flowering plant

Beyeria lechenaultii (common name - pale turpentine bush) is a species of dioecious (rarely monoecious) flowering plant in the spurge family, Euphorbiaceae, that is endemic to Australia.

It was first described in 1817 by Augustin Pyramus de Candolle as Hemistemma lechenaultii, using a specimen collected on St Francis Island, South Australia but in 1866 Henri Ernest Baillon assigned the species to the genus, Beyeria. The specific epithet, lechenaultii, honours the French botanist, Jean-Baptiste Leschenault de La Tour.

== Description ==
Beyeria lechenaultii is a sticky shrub which grows up to 1.5 m (4.9 ft) high. Its leaves are oblong to linear, and the margins are sometimes recurved. The lower surfaces are woolly except on the midrib. The male flowers are found in groups of one to three, on a sticky stalk which is 1–6 mm (0.04–0.24 in) long. The sepals of the male flowers are plus or minus sticky. The female flowers are solitary on whitish stalks which lengthen when in fruit. The sepals of the female flowers are about 2 mm (0.08 in) long and whitish. The stigma has 3 broad recurved (curved backwards) lobes at its base. The capsule is ovoid to globose, and the stigma persists. It usually has three seeds which are about 5 mm (0.20 in) long and reddish-brown. It flowers in spring.

In New South Wales it is usually an understorey shrub in mallee communities.

== Uses ==
The Noongar people of southwest Western Australia drank decoctions of the leaves to treat tuberculosis and fevers.
