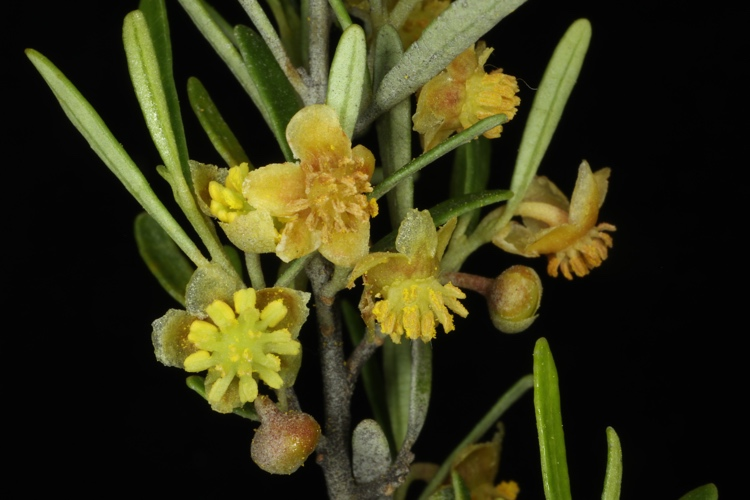

Scientific classification
- Kingdom: Plantae
- Clade: Embryophytes
- Clade: Tracheophytes
- Clade: Angiosperms
- Clade: Eudicots
- Clade: Rosids
- Order: Malpighiales
- Family: Euphorbiaceae
- Genus: Beyeria
- Species: B. opaca

Binomial name
- Beyeria opaca F.Muell.

= Beyeria opaca =

Smooth wallaby-bush

Species of flowering plant

Beyeria opaca, commonly known as smooth wallaby-bush, is a flowering plant in the family Euphorbiaceae. It is a perennial shrub with sticky leaves, yellowish sepals and grows in Victoria, South Australia, New South Wales and Western Australia.

== Description ==
Beyeria opaca is an upright perennial shrub to 1 m (3 ft 3 in) high. Leaves initially yellowish green turning dark grey as they age. The leaves and branches sticky, leaves 1–15 mm (0.039–0.591 in) long, 2–3 mm (0.079–0.118 in) wide, oblong to wedge-shaped, shiny green on upper surface, pale underneath, hairless, tapering at the base, margins flat or curved. Male flowers in a small cluster of 1-3, sepals yellow to brown, 2–3 mm (0.079–0.118 in) long, female flowers solitary, sepals greenish, shorter on a peduncle 1–4 mm (0.039–0.157 in) long. Flowering occurs mainly in spring and the fruit is an ovoid, flattened capsule, usually 5–6 mm (0.20–0.24 in) long.

== Taxonomy ==
Beyeria opaca was first formally described in 1854 by Ferdinand von Mueller and the description was published in Transactions of the Philosophical Society of Victoria.

== Distribution and habitat ==
Smooth wallaby-bush grows on sand dunes, sand plains and red sandy clay in South Australia, New South Wales, Victoria and Western Australia.
