= Shonia =

Scientific classification
- Kingdom: Plantae
- Clade: Tracheophytes
- Clade: Angiosperms
- Clade: Eudicots
- Clade: Rosids
- Order: Malpighiales
- Family: Euphorbiaceae
- Subfamily: Crotonoideae
- Tribe: Ricinocarpeae
- Genus: Shonia; R.J.F.Hend. & Halford

Genus of plants

Shonia is a genus of plants in the family Euphorbiaceae first described as a genus in 2005. The entire genus is endemic to Australia.

== Species ==
As of December 2025, Plants of the World Online accepted the following species:

- Shonia bickertonensis (Specht) Halford & R.J.F.Hend. – Northern Territory
- Shonia carinata Halford & R.J.F.Hend. – Queensland
- Shonia territorialis Halford & R.J.F.Hend. – Northern Territory
- Shonia tristigma (F.Muell.) Halford & R.J.F.Hend. – Queensland
