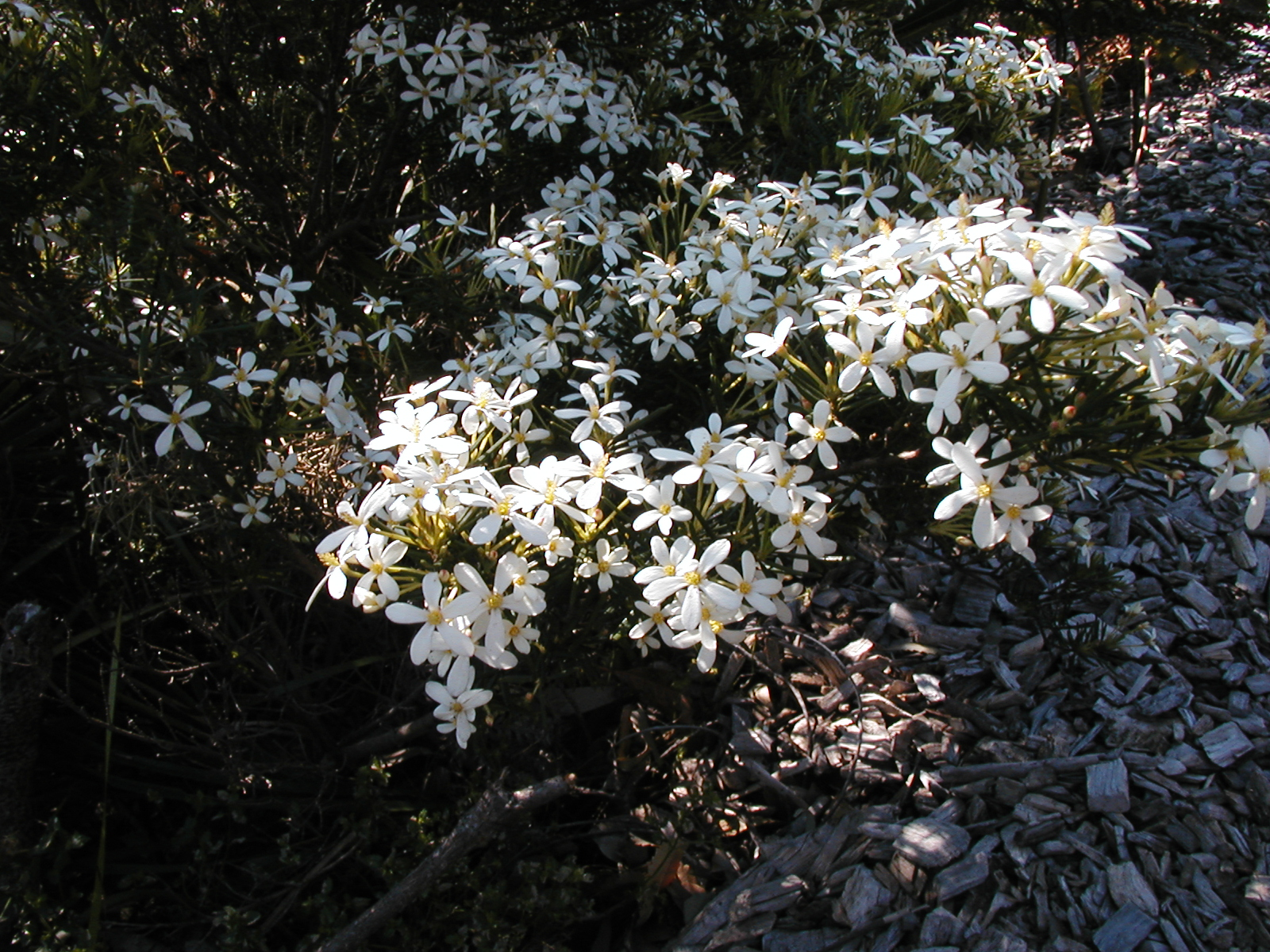
- Ricinocarpos pinifolius

Scientific classification
- Kingdom: Plantae
- Clade: Tracheophytes
- Clade: Angiosperms
- Clade: Eudicots
- Clade: Rosids
- Order: Malpighiales
- Family: Euphorbiaceae
- Subfamily: Crotonoideae
- Tribe: Ricinocarpeae; Müll.Arg.

Genera
- Subtribe Bertyinae Bertya Borneodendron Cocconerion Myricanthe Subtribe Ricinocarpinae Alphandia Beyeria Ricinocarpos

= Ricinocarpeae =

Tribe of flowering plants

Ricinocarpeae is a tribe of the subfamily Crotonoideae, under the family Euphorbiaceae. It comprises 2 subtribes and 7 genera.

== See also ==
- Taxonomy of the Euphorbiaceae
