= Western Australian Herbarium =

Herbarium for Western Australian flora

Coordinates: 31.9964°S 115.8839°E

The Western Australian Herbarium is the state herbarium, situated in Perth, the capital of Western Australia. It houses a collection of more than 845,000 dried specimens of plants, algae, bryophytes (mosses, liverworts and hornworts), lichens, fungi and slime moulds gathered from 1770 to today throughout Western Australia and from across the globe.

It is part of the Government of Western Australia's Department of Biodiversity, Conservation and Attractions, and has responsibility for the description and documentation of the flora of Western Australia. It has the Index Herbariorum code of PERTH.

The herbarium forms part of the Australasian Virtual Herbarium. The Herbarium's collection represents the work of over 13,000 collectors, encompassing more than 500 surveys and 180 studies across Western Australia. It is linked to the Western Australian 'Regional Herbaria Network' – which links approximately 84 regional community groups which have local reference collections.

== History ==
The Western Australian Herbarium was formed as the amalgamation of three separate government department herbaria: those of the Western Australian Museum, the Department of Agriculture, and the "forest herbarium" maintained by the Conservator of Forests. The first of these was formed by Bernard Henry Woodward, Director of the Museum and Art Gallery, probably around 1895; the second was probably formed with the appointment of Alexander Morrison as botanist to the Department of Agriculture in 1897. In 1906 the Department of Agriculture handed its herbarium over to the museum, but reclaimed it in 1911. The "forest herbarium" commenced in 1916. Around 1928, the government decided to amalgamate the three into a single state herbarium, to be managed by the Department of Agriculture. The "forest herbarium" was handed over more or less immediately, but the museum was opposed to the merger, and did not hand over its specimens until around 1959.

Charles Austin Gardner, who served as government botanist and curator of the state herbarium, played a crucial role in organising the collection. In 1924, as assistant botanist, he implemented the first systematic family arrangement based on Adolf Engler's system. Gardner later developed a decimal numbering system that formed the basis for organising specimens for many decades. He annotated J.C. Willis' "A Dictionary of the Flowering Plants and Ferns" (4th edition, 1919) with his numbering system, as it provided a more portable reference than Engler's multi-volume works.

Prior to 1938, the collections remained unmounted, but mounting work was completed by July 1946. The early organisation system included brown outer folders with handwritten genus names by Gardner on the lower left side and genus initials with specific epithets on the lower right. Around 1955, these were replaced with new folders and plastic stencils.

When the state herbarium was officially established in 1929, it was housed within the Department of Agriculture headquarters on St Georges Terrace. The collection was housed in the state observatory building from December 1933 to 1959, organised within 25 wooden cupboards. During this periods, bound herbarium indexes were produced to help locate specimens, though only the 1953 and 1959 editions have survived. The constant need to reshuffle specimens made maintaining these manual indexes challenging until computerisation in the 1980s. Following this, the herbarium moved to the Department of Agriculture headquarters' B Block in South Perth (1959–1970). In 1970, the herbarium moved to a new purpose-built facility in the Collier pine plantation in South Perth. The building featured two windowless, air-conditioned vaults with fire detection and carbon dioxide fire-fighting systems, as well as the ability to be sealed for fumigation. At the time of opening, the collection comprised more than 100,000 specimens, and the building was designed to accommodate 15 years of growth. The facility included a basement for specimen preparation and storage, a library, conference room, anatomy-cytology laboratory, and workspace for visiting botanists on the ground floor, with botanists' rooms and herbarium vaults on the first floor. The staff at this time included nine professional botanists, with five taxonomists working toward producing a flora of Western Australia. In 2009, the collections were relocated to their current home at the Keiran McNamara Conservation Science Centre in Kensington.

In 1988 departmental responsibility was shifted from the Department of Agriculture to the Department of Conservation and Land Management, the Department of Parks and Wildlife, and now the Department of Biodiversity, Conservation and Attractions.

In 2019, the herbarium catalogued its 800,000th specimen, a Stenanthera pungens collected from Chinocup Nature Reserve about 180 kilometres (110 mi) northwest of Albany. The herbarium's collection includes specimens dating back to the 18th century, including a eucalyptus branch collected by Joseph Banks during Captain James Cook's voyage along the Endeavour River in Far North Queensland in 1770.

== Physical facilities and collections ==
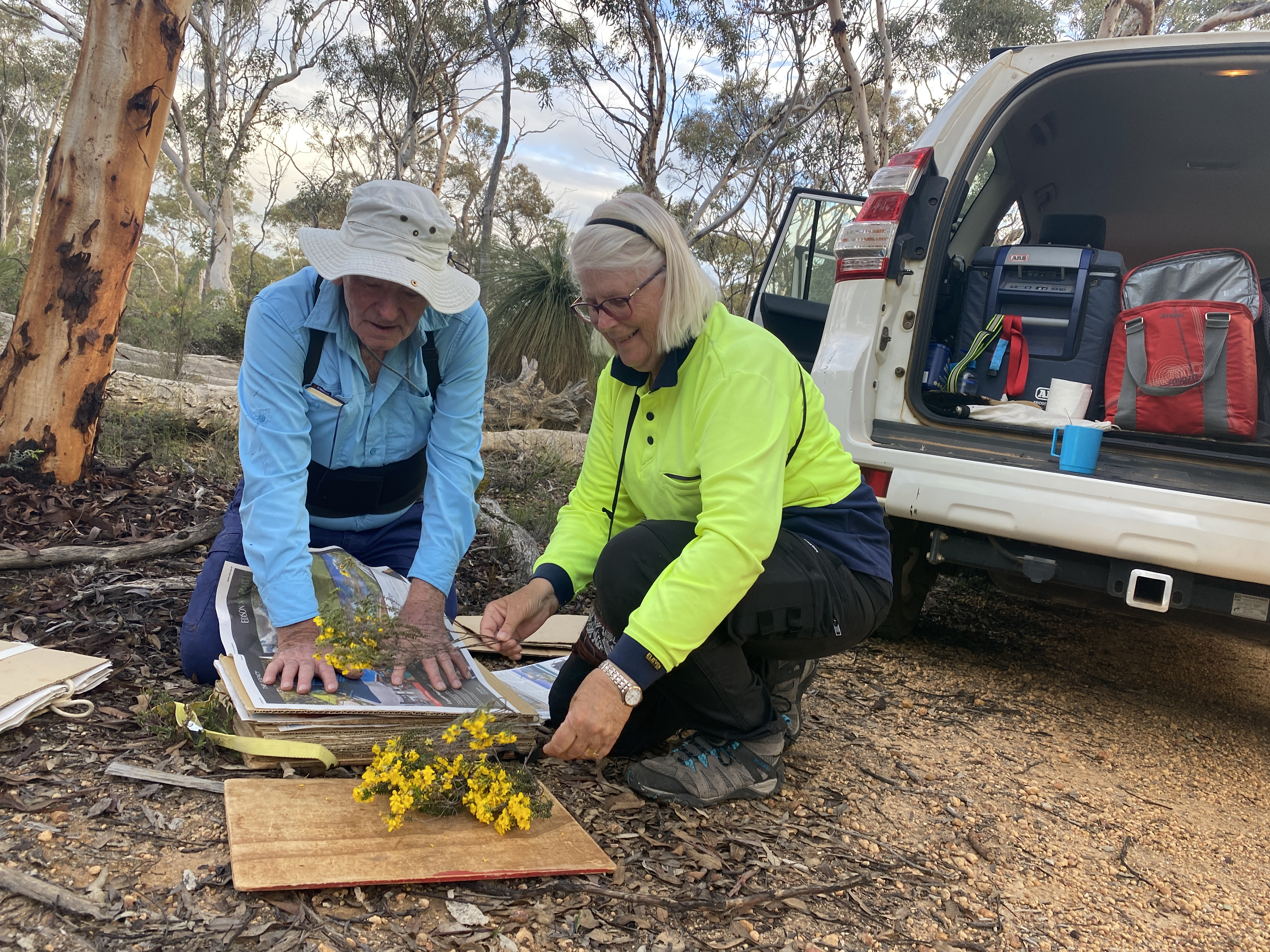
Collected specimens of Hibbertia polyancistra being prepared in the field for future record and study at the Western Australian Herbarium

The Western Australian Herbarium's research collections are housed at the Keiran McNamara Conservation Science Centre in Kensington, where they are maintained in four main vaults plus two specialised storage areas. A dedicated types vault houses type specimens and significant historical collections predating 1829, including materials from the notable botanists Robert Brown, Joseph Banks, Daniel Solander, and James Drummond. A sixth vault accommodates specimens on loan to the institution.

The herbarium maintains several specialised collections. The wet or spirit collection is organised by container size and accession number, while the carpological collection (fruits and seeds) is stored alongside related family specimens. Type specimens, originally integrated within the main collection, are now separately housed with enhanced security and fire protection. The institution also maintains photographic slides, digital images in a departmental repository, and developing collections of microscope slides and molecular tissues.

Specimens are stored in archival-quality pH-buffered folders, with contemporary specimens organised using a colour-coding system to distinguish materials from different Australian states and territories. Non-vascular plants, including algae, fungi, lichens, mosses, liverworts, and hornworts, are arranged alphabetically by genus due to ongoing taxonomic revisions. The herbarium employs electronic indexing for specimen location and management within its collection spaces.

The herbarium maintains special security measures for its most valuable specimens, which are kept in a sophisticated fire-proof vault. This secure storage area is designed with an oxygen-displacement system that would remove oxygen from the room in the event of a fire to protect the collection.

In addition to its research collections, the herbarium maintains a separate self-service reference herbarium that is open to the public, industry consultants, and community members for specimen identification purposes. While not comprehensive, this reference collection provides adequate resources for most identification needs.

== Digital access ==
The herbarium's collections are accessible through multiple digital platforms. The full database is available through FloraBase (the herbarium's primary portal), the Australasian Virtual Herbarium, the Atlas of Living Australia, and the Global Biodiversity Information Facility (GBIF). The herbarium has initiated a comprehensive digitisation project, using a high-resolution camera system to create digital images of all collection items for online access.

== Collection organisation ==
The herbarium's taxonomic arrangement has evolved significantly over time. Initially organised using Engler's system and Gardner's decimal numbering system, the collection underwent a major reorganisation in 2009 to reflect modern systematic relationships recognized by the Angiosperm Phylogeny Group (APG III). In 2018, the herbarium implemented the APG IV phylogenetic arrangement of families, which is expected to remain relatively stable due to its basis in wide-ranging evidence and repeatable analysis methods.

Within this system, genera and species are arranged alphabetically within their families to facilitate collections management and ease of access. The Taxonomic Review Committee (TRC) has adopted certain exceptions to the APG IV system based on specialist recommendations. For ferns and fern allies, the herbarium implemented the PPG I classification in 2020, while gymnosperm arrangements follow a standardised classification system for gymnosperms proposed by Christenhusz and colleagues in 2011.

The herbarium has adopted a 'punctuated equilibrium model' for future arrangements, whereby systematic changes are implemented based on widely accepted collaborative taxonomic syntheses rather than individual research publications. This approach helps maintain stability while allowing for periodic updates as scientific consensus evolves. Non-vascular plants, including algae, fungi, lichens, mosses, liverworts, and hornworts, maintain an alphabetical arrangement by genus due to ongoing taxonomic flux.

== Contributors ==
Significant contributors include:

- Alex George
- Arthur Weston

== Publications ==
The Western Australian Herbarium produces several publications:

- Nuytsia (journal) (journal), the herbarium's scientific journal
- Kingia, published by the Western Australian Herbarium since 1988
- Western Australian Herbarium Research Notes (1978–1986)
- Census of the Vascular Plants of Western Australia, first published in February 1981 by John Green, then Curator of the Herbarium, followed by a second edition and supplements in 1985
- The Western Australian Flora: A Descriptive Catalogue (2000), published in collaboration with the Wildflower Society of Western Australia and the Botanic Gardens and Parks Authority

The herbarium also maintains the Western Australian Plant Census database, which provides current taxonomic information about the state's flora.

== See also ==
- FloraBase – the Western Australian Flora
