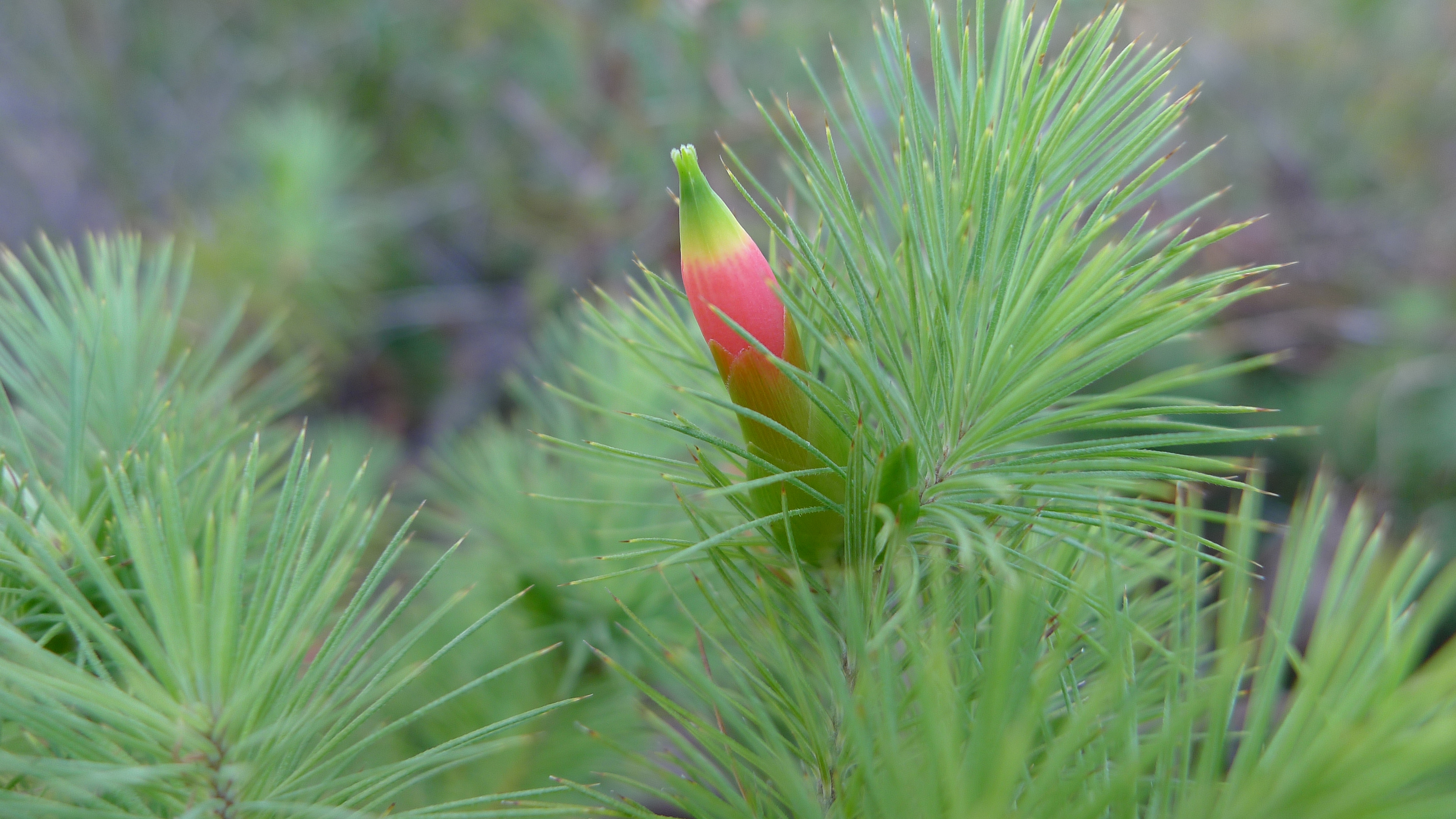
- Stenanthera pinifolia in Heathcote National Park

Scientific classification
- Kingdom: Plantae
- Clade: Tracheophytes
- Clade: Angiosperms
- Clade: Eudicots
- Clade: Asterids
- Order: Ericales
- Family: Ericaceae
- Genus: Stenanthera
- Species: S. pinifolia

Binomial name
- Stenanthera pinifolia R.Br.

Synonyms
- Astroloma pinifolium (R.Br.) Benth.; Styphelia pinifolia (R.Br.) Spreng.

= Stenanthera pinifolia =

Pine heath

Species of shrub

Stenanthera pinifolia, commonly known as pine heath, is a species flowering plant in the family Ericaceae. It is a of shrub that is endemic to south-eastern Australia. It has narrow, linear leaves, yellow or red tubular flowers and a small edible berry.

== Description ==
Stenanthera pinifolia is an erect, or spreading, decumbent or diffuse shrub that typically grows to a height of 15–100 cm (5.9–39.4 in). The leaves are arranged densely along the branchlets, narrow linear, 9.5–25 mm (0.37–0.98 in) long, 0.3–1 mm (0.012–0.039 in) wide and soft to touch. The flowers are erect, more or less sessile and arranged singly in leaf axils but often appear clustered at the base of branches. There are bracts 0.5–8 mm (0.020–0.315 in) long and bracteoles 7–9 mm (0.28–0.35 in) long at the base of the flowers. The sepals are egg-shaped 9–12 mm (0.35–0.47 in) long. The petal tube is more or less cylindrical, 9–20 mm (0.35–0.79 in) long, mostly yellow, sometimes reddish near the base and the petal lobes are triangular, green and 4–6 mm (0.16–0.24 in) long and densely hairy inside. The anthers project beyond the end of the petal tube and the style is 11–16 mm (0.43–0.63 in) long. The fruit is an oval to globe-shaped, edible berry about 5–15 mm (0.20–0.59 in) long and white when mature. Flowering occurs from spring to summer.

== Taxonomy and naming ==
Stenanthera pinifolia was first formally described in 1810 by Robert Brown in Prodromus Florae Novae Hollandiae et Insulae Van Diemen. The specific epithet (pinifolia) is derived from Latin words meaning "pine" and "-leaved".

== Distribution and habitat ==
Pine heath mainly grows in open forest and heathy woodland or forest on well-drained sandy soils or in rocky places. It occurs along the coast and nearby tablelands of New South Wales south from Evans Head, mainly in the Grampians but also further east in Victoria, and in Tasmania. It co-occurs with such species as Eucalyptus sieberi, E. globoidea, and Angophora costata or with Allocasuarina distyla and Banksia ericifolia.

== Ecology ==
The Tasmanian subspecies of the grey currawong (known locally as clinking currawong or black jay) appears especially fond of the berries. One observer noting how sluggish and quiet the normally noisy birds were, wondered whether there was some narcotic effect the plant imparted on the birds.
