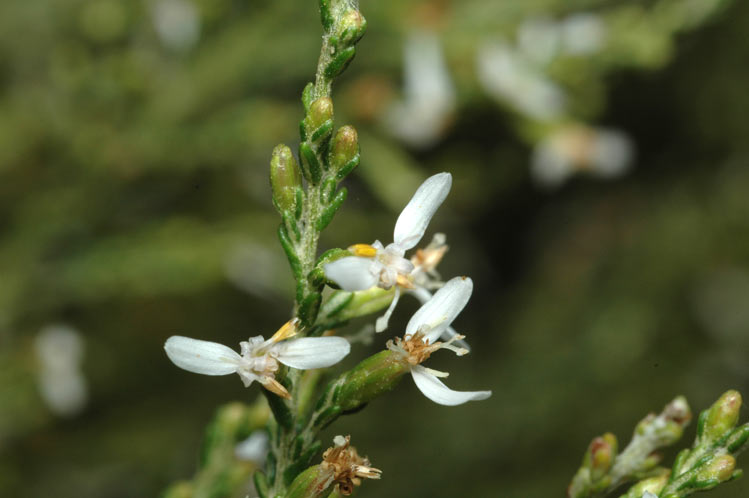

Conservation status
- Endangered (EPBC Act)

Scientific classification
- Kingdom: Plantae
- Clade: Tracheophytes
- Clade: Angiosperms
- Clade: Eudicots
- Clade: Asterids
- Order: Asterales
- Family: Asteraceae
- Genus: Olearia
- Species: O. microdisca

Binomial name
- Olearia microdisca J.M.Black

= Olearia microdisca =

Species of shrub

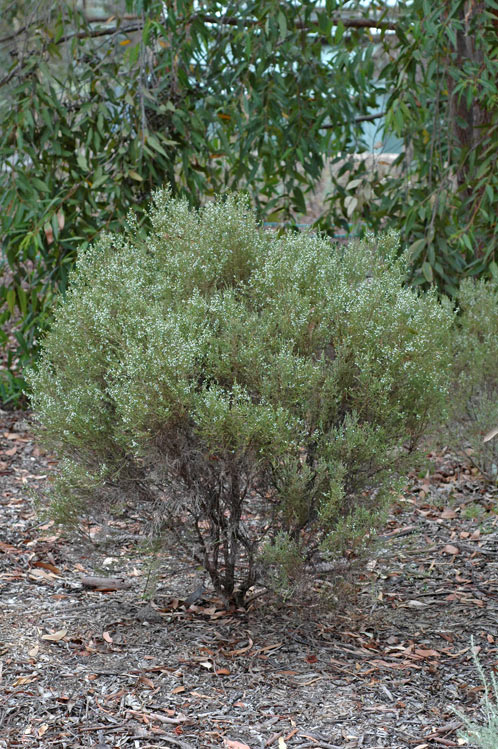
Habit in the Australian National Botanic Gardens

Olearia microdisca, commonly known as small-flowered daisy-bush, is a species of flowering plant in the family Asteraceae and is endemic to Kangaroo Island, South Australia. It is a compact shrub with small, crowded, oblong leaves and white and yellow, daisy-like inflorescences.

== Description ==
Olearia microdisca is a compact shrub that typically grows to a height of up to 1.5 m (4 ft 11 in) and has many softly-hairy branches. Its leaves are crowded, sometime overlapping each other, oblong 1.5–2.5 mm (0.059–0.098 in) long, about 1 mm (0.039 in) wide and sessile. The upper surface of the leaves is glabrous, the lower surface is woolly-hairy and the edges are rolled under. The heads or daisy-like "flowers" are arranged singly on the ends of erect branches and sessile. Each head has two to five white ray florets, the ligules about 3 mm (0.12 in) long, surrounding two or three yellow disc florets. Flowering occurs in most months and the fruit is a softly-hairy achene, the pappus about 2 mm (0.079 in) long with 25 to 35 bristles.

== Taxonomy ==
Olearia microdisca was first formally described in 1928 by John McConnell Black in Transactions and Proceedings of the Royal Society of South Australia.

== Distribution and habitat ==
Small-flowered daisy-bush grows in heath and mallee and is restricted to Kangaroo Island in South Australia.

== Conservation status ==
Olearia microdisca is listed as "endangered" under the Australian Government Environment Protection and Biodiversity Conservation Act 1999. A recovery plan for nationally threatened plant species on Kangaroo Island, including O. microdisca, has been prepared.
