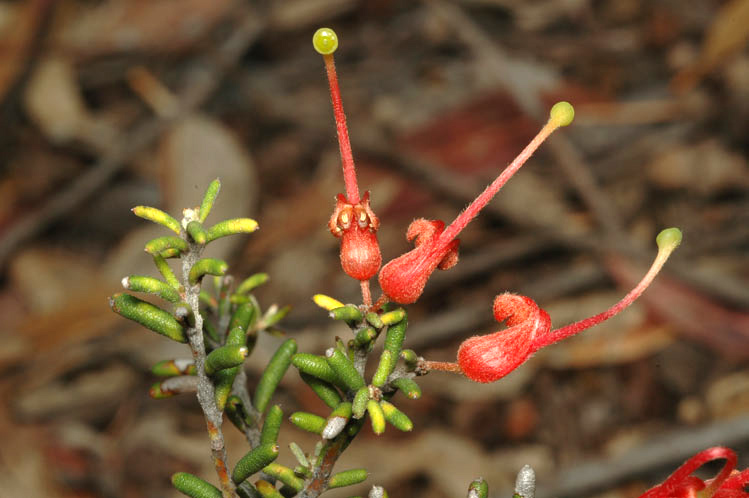
- In the Australian National Botanic Gardens

Conservation status
- Endangered (IUCN 3.1)

Scientific classification
- Kingdom: Plantae
- Clade: Tracheophytes
- Clade: Angiosperms
- Clade: Eudicots
- Order: Proteales
- Family: Proteaceae
- Genus: Grevillea
- Species: G. muricata

Binomial name
- Grevillea muricata J.M.Black

= Grevillea muricata =

Species of plant endemic to Australia

Grevillea muricata is a species of flowering plant in the family Proteaceae and is endemic to Kangaroo Island in South Australia. It is a low, spreading shrub with narrowly oblong to more or less linear to cylindrical leaves and small groups of bright orange-red flowers.

== Description ==
Grevillea muricata is a spreading shrub that typically grows to a height of 0.3–1.0 m (1 ft 0 in – 3 ft 3 in) and has woolly-hairy branchlets. The leaves are narrowly oblong to more or less linear to cylindrical, 2–17 mm (0.079–0.669 in) long and 1.0–2.1 mm (0.039–0.083 in) wide. The edges of the leaves are rolled, under enclosing most of the lower surface, and the upper surface of the leaves is covered with small sharp points. The flowers are arranged singly or in groups of up to 6 on a rachis 0.5–0.7 mm (0.020–0.028 in) long. The flowers are orange-red, the style with a yellowish green end, the pistil 24–25 mm (0.94–0.98 in) long. Flowering occurs from August to November and the fruit is an elliptic to narrowly oval follicle 12.5–14.5 mm (0.49–0.57 in) long.

== Taxonomy ==
Grevillea muricata was first formally described in 1939 by John McConnell Black in the Transactions of the Royal Society of South Australia from specimens collected between Vivonne Bay and Kingscote on Kangaroo Island in 1924. The specific epithet (muricata) means "muricate".

== Distribution and habitat ==
The species grows in open woodland and in dense scrub in the central-eastern part of Kangaroo Island in South Australia.

== Conservation status ==
Grevillea muricata is listed as endangered on the IUCN Red List of Threatened Species. It has a limited distribution with an extent of occurrence and area of occupancy of 500 km^{2} (190 sq mi), and it only occurs in five subpopulations. These are under threat from land clearing, competition with invasive species and wildfire. Not much is known about the species' population total, however it is believed to be in decline.
