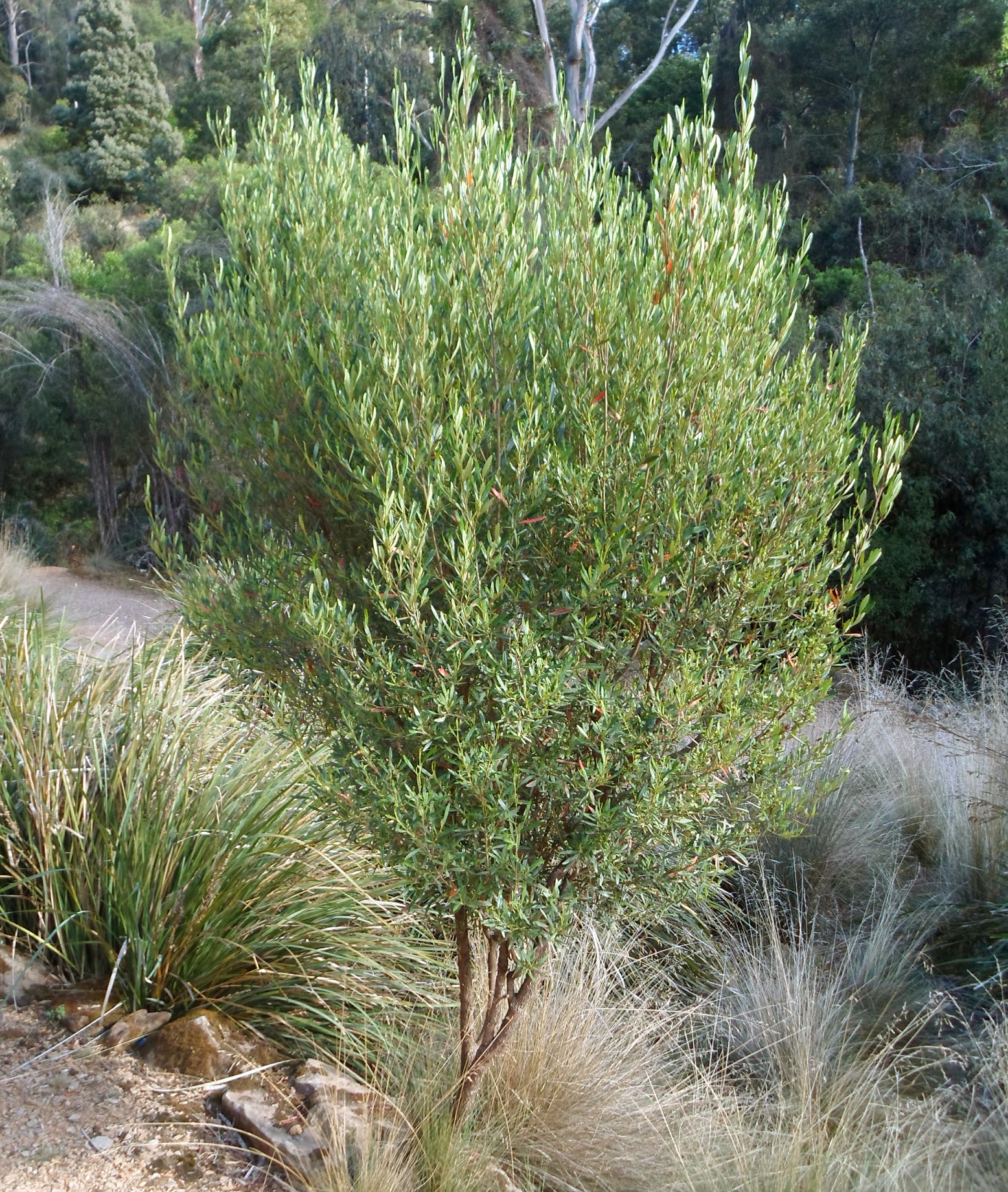
- Young specimen growing at Snake Gully in the Cataract Gorge Reserve, Launceston

Scientific classification
- Kingdom: Plantae
- Clade: Embryophytes
- Clade: Tracheophytes
- Clade: Spermatophytes
- Clade: Angiosperms
- Clade: Eudicots
- Clade: Rosids
- Order: Malpighiales
- Family: Euphorbiaceae
- Genus: Beyeria
- Species: B. viscosa

Binomial name
- Beyeria viscosa Labill.
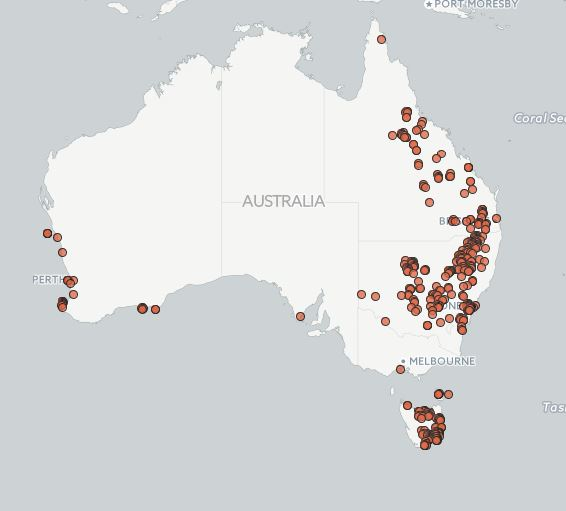

= Beyeria viscosa =

Species of plant

Beyeria viscosa, commonly known as the pinkwood or sticky wallaby bush (New South Wales), is a species of flowering plant in the spurge family, Euphorbiaceae, that is endemic to Australia.

== Description ==
Beyeria viscosa is a pyramidal shrub growing to 3–4 m (9.8–13.1 ft) tall, rarely a small tree to 9 m (30 ft) tall. Leaves are spirally arranged, oblong to oblanceolate from 2–5 cm long by 5–15 mm wide tapering towards the petiole with flat or with slightly recurved margins. The upper leaf surface is glabrous and often viscid were by the lower surface is somewhat lighter. Male flowers are cream-yellow and clustered in groups of 2 or 3 with 4 mm long sepals and numerous short stamens. Female flowers lack petals and are solitary with 2–3 mm long sepals, roughly globose ovary and large sessile stigma. Fruit capsules are glabrous or sparsely pubescent with a viscid coating similar to that of the leaves and range from 6–8 mm long with a 2 mm wide persistent stigma. Fruit capsule contains up to 3 smooth, oblong seeds which usually germinate within 5–7 days of planting. Pinkwoods are dioecious, with separate sexes, some shrubs being female and others being male. Plants flower from December to February through the peak of summer. As the common name implies, the timber of B. viscosa bears a pink hue similar to that of Nothofagus cunninghamii but the general small scale of the plant renders it unviable as a timber tree. The plant responds well to being pruned where is can be maintained as a hedge.

== Distribution and habitat ==
Beyeria viscosa is found throughout Australia with the exception of the Northern Territory but is most abundant in dry areas of central eastern New South Wales and eastern Tasmania where it is a common understory shrub to Eucalypts. Plants prefer poor, well drained soils on semi-shaded sites and are abundant in riparian habitats, gullies and on rocky hills and ridges where they can form dense stands.

== Gallery ==
<

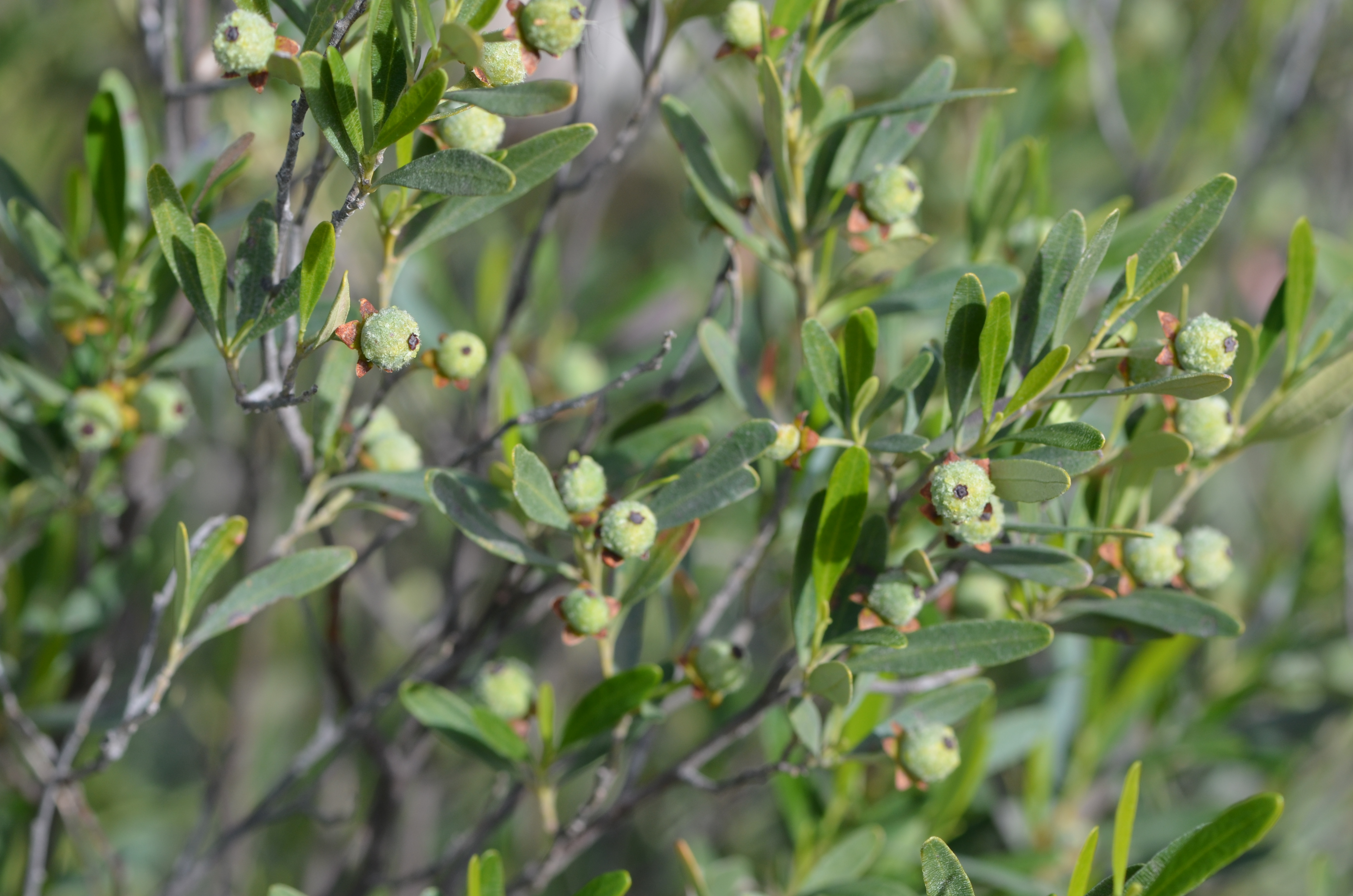
Gins Leap, NSW

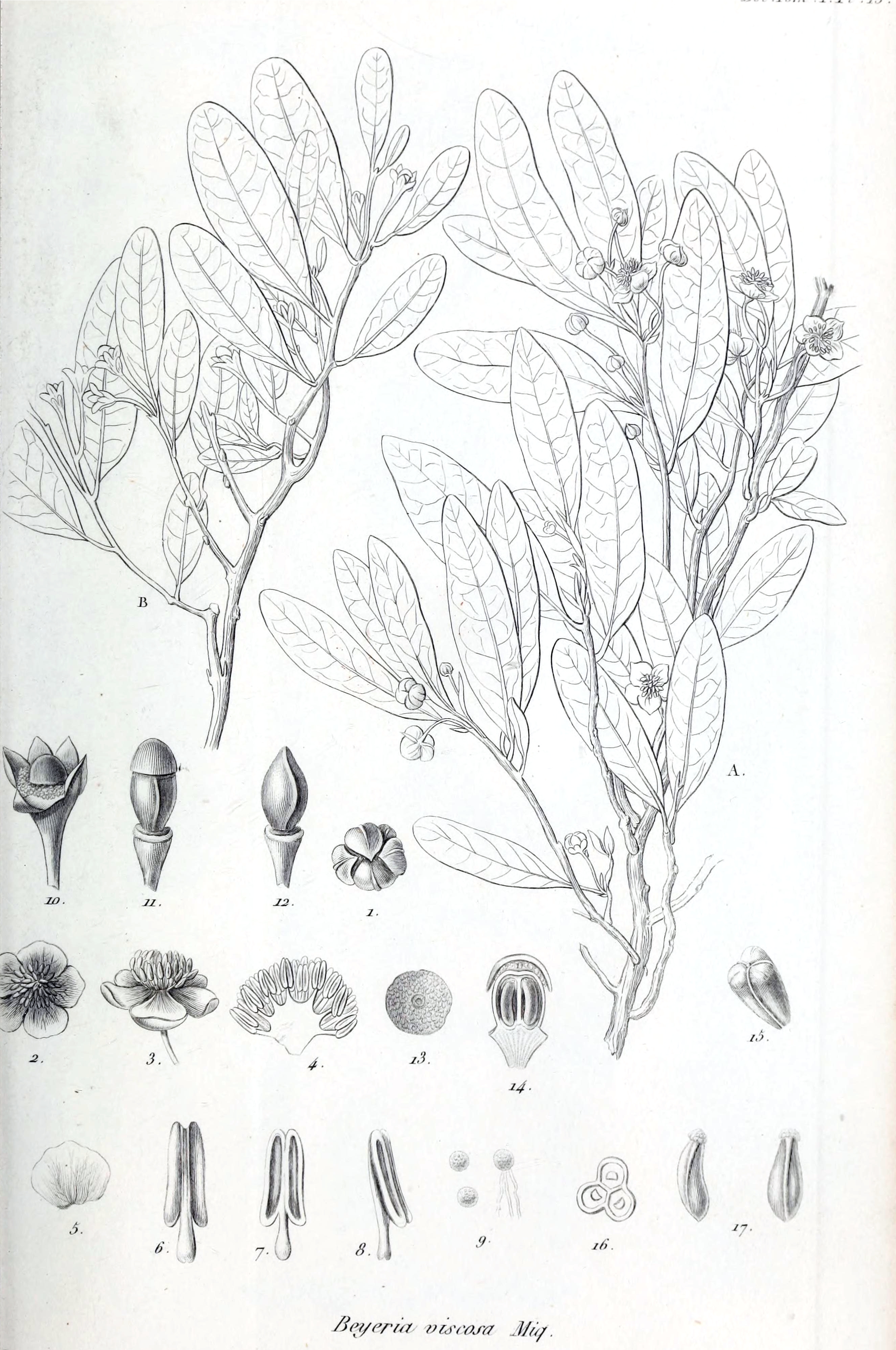
Miquel, F.A.G. 1844. Beyeria, novum genus Euphorbiacearum. Annales des Sciences Naturelle; Botanique sér. 3, 1: 350–352, plate 15
