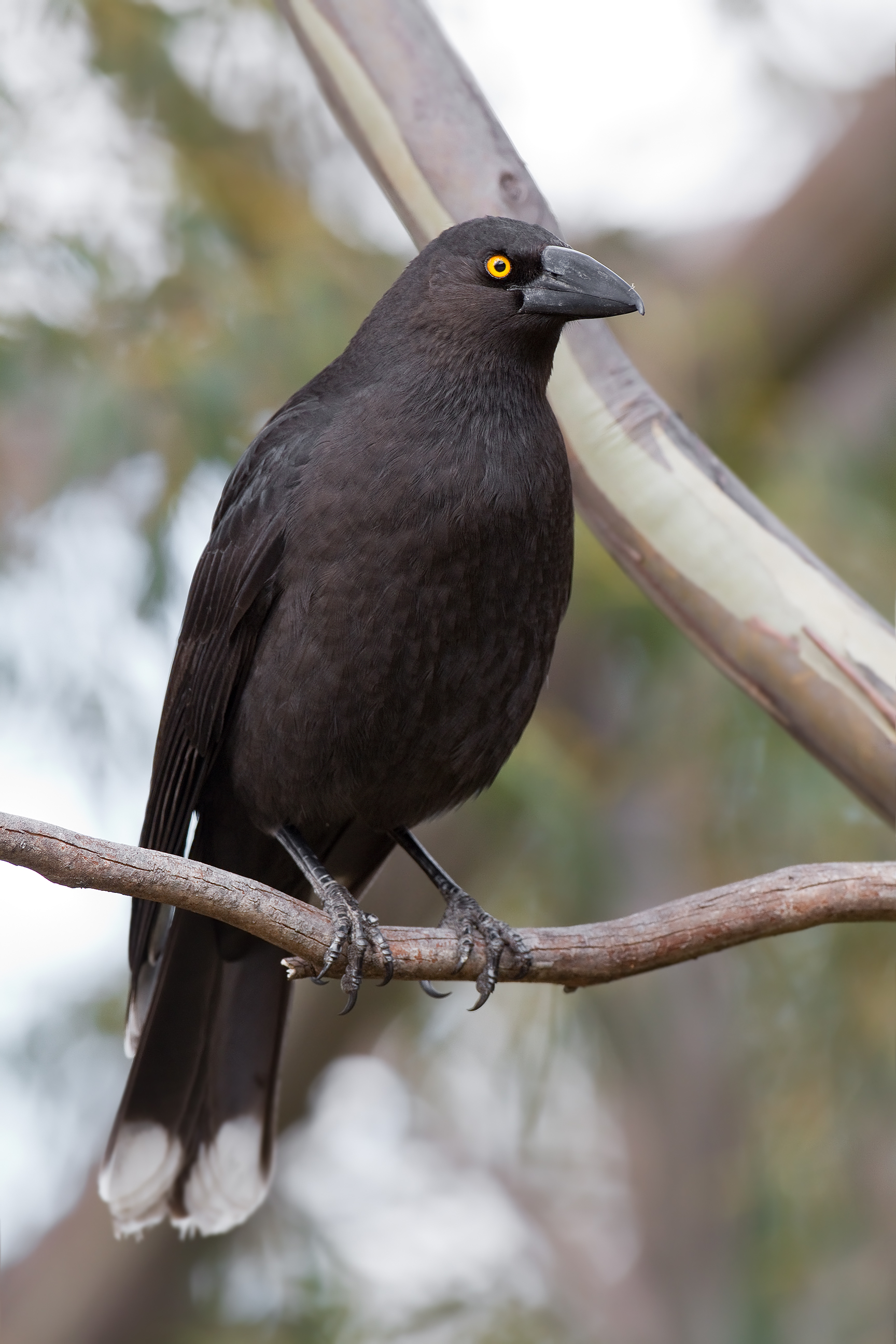
- Black currawong, Tasmania

Conservation status
- Least Concern (IUCN 3.1)

Scientific classification
- Kingdom: Animalia
- Phylum: Chordata
- Class: Aves
- Order: Passeriformes
- Family: Artamidae
- Subfamily: Cracticinae
- Genus: Strepera
- Species: S. fuliginosa

Binomial name
- Strepera fuliginosa (Gould, 1837)
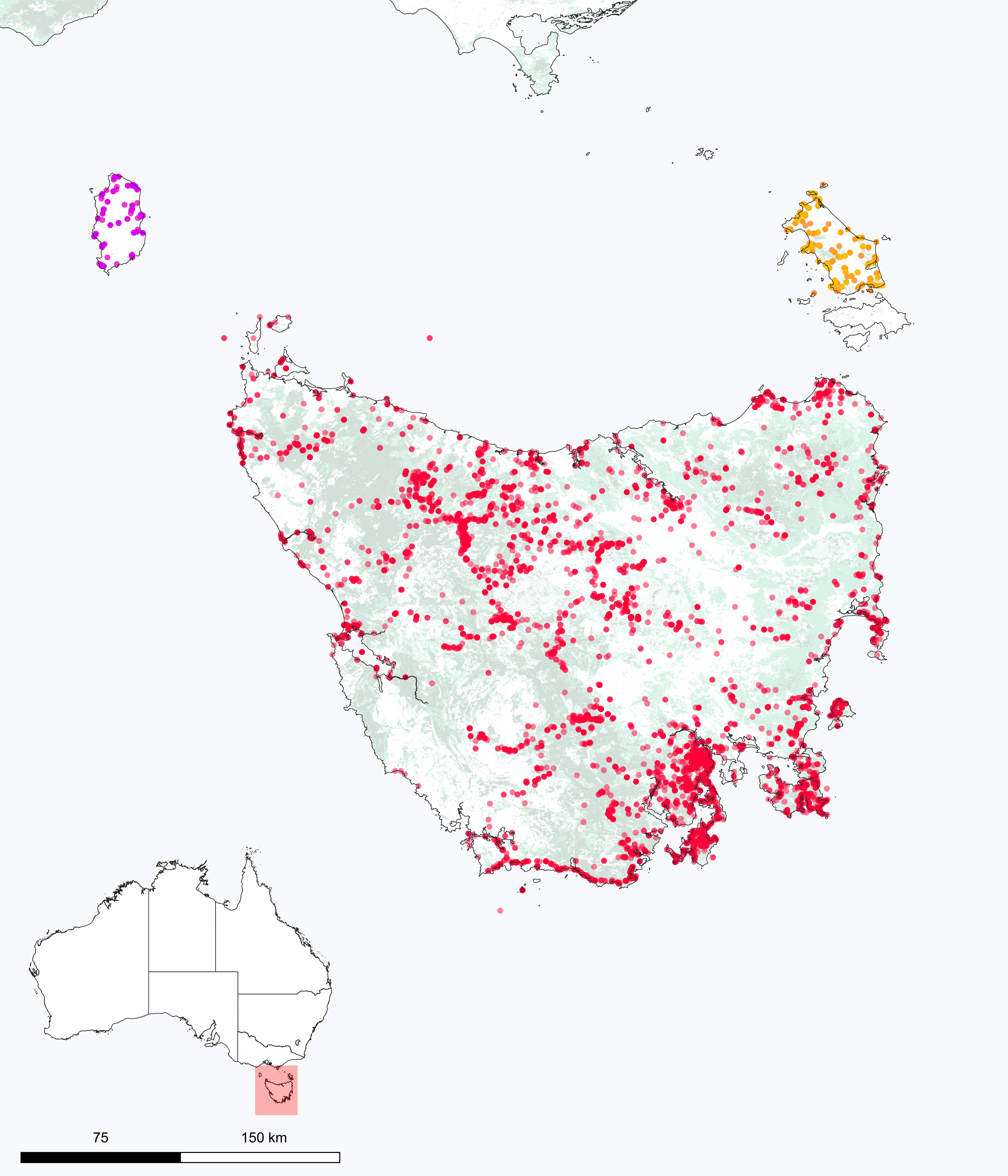
Black currawong range
subspecies indicated
fuliginosa
colei
parvior

= Black currawong =

Large passerine bird endemic to Tasmania and Bass Strait islands

The black currawong (Strepera fuliginosa), also known locally as the black jay, is a large passerine bird endemic to Tasmania and the nearby islands within the Bass Strait. One of three currawong species in the genus Strepera, it is closely related to the butcherbirds and Australian magpie within the family Artamidae. It is a large crow-like bird, around 50 cm (20 in) long on average, with yellow irises, a heavy bill, and black plumage with white wing patches. The male and female are similar in appearance. Three subspecies are recognised, one of which, Strepera fuliginosa colei of King Island, is vulnerable to extinction.

Within its range, the black currawong is generally sedentary, although populations at higher altitudes relocate to lower areas during the cooler months. The habitat includes densely forested areas as well as alpine heathland. It is rare below altitudes of 200 m (660 ft). Omnivorous, its diet includes a variety of berries, invertebrates, and small vertebrates. Less arboreal than the pied currawong, the black currawong spends more time foraging on the ground. It roosts and breeds in trees.

== Taxonomy ==
The black currawong was first described by ornithologist John Gould in 1836 as Cracticus fuliginosus, and in 1837 as Coronica fuliginosa. The specific epithet is the Late Latin adjective fuliginosus "sooty" from Latin fūlīgo "soot", and refers to the black plumage. American ornithologist Dean Amadon regarded the black currawong as a subspecies of the pied currawong (Strepera graculina), seeing it as part of a continuum with subspecies ashbyi of the latter species, the complex having progressively less white plumage as one moves south. Subsequent authors have considered it a separate species, although Richard Schodde and Ian Mason describe it as forming a superspecies with the pied currawong. A 2013 genetic analysis by Anna Kearns and colleagues gave some indication that the black currawong lineage diverged from a common ancestor of the grey and pied currawongs (though sampling was limited and not the focus of the study).

Common names include black currawong, sooty currawong, black bell-magpie, black or mountain magpie, black or sooty crow-shrike, and muttonbird. Black jay is a local name applied to the species within Tasmania. The species is often confused with the local dark-plumaged subspecies of the grey currawong (S. versicolor), known as the clinking currawong or hill magpie.

There are three subspecies of the black currawong: the nominate form Strepera fuliginosa fuliginosa of Tasmania; Strepera fuliginosa parvior of Flinders Island, described by Schodde and Mason in 1999; and Strepera fuliginosa colei of King Island, described by Gregory Mathews in 1916. The two island subspecies have identical plumage to the nominate, but are slightly smaller with shorter wings and tails, subspecies colei having a shorter tail than parvior.

Together with the pied and grey currawong, the black currawong forms the genus Strepera. Although crow-like in appearance and habits, currawongs are only distantly related to true crows, and are instead closely related to the Australian magpie and the butcherbirds. The affinities of all three genera were recognised early on and they were placed in the family Cracticidae in 1914 by ornithologist John Albert Leach after he had studied their musculature. Ornithologists Charles Sibley and Jon E. Ahlquist recognised the close relationship between the woodswallows and the butcherbirds and relatives in 1985, and combined them into a Cracticini clade, which later became the family Artamidae.

== Description ==
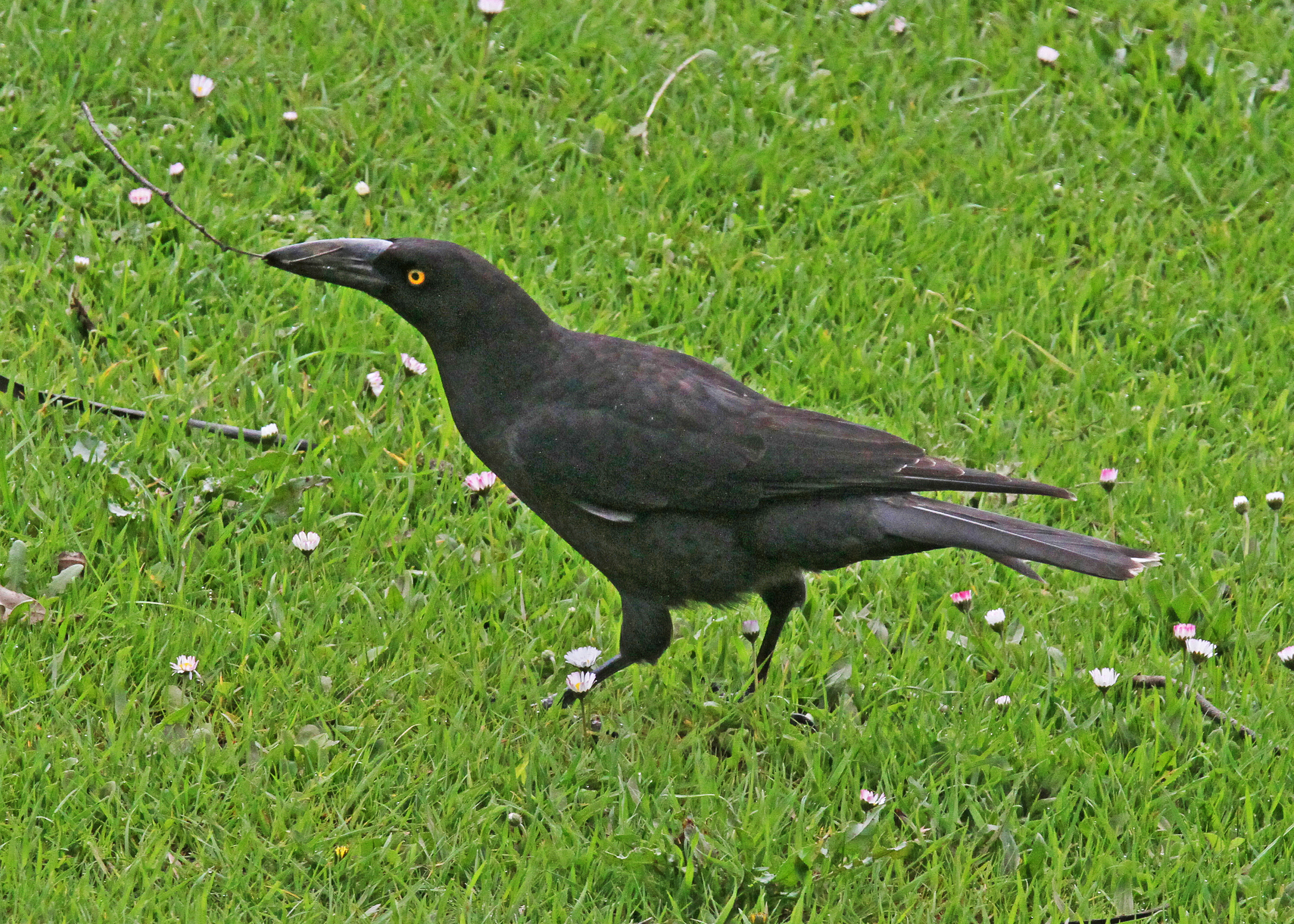
Gathering nesting material near Loongana, Tasmania

The black currawong is about 50 cm (20 in) long with an 80 cm (31 in) wingspan. The male is somewhat larger and heavier than the female; males of the nominate subspecies average 405 g (14.3 oz) to females' 340 g (12 oz). Male wings average around 27 cm (11 in) and tails 19 cm (7.5 in), while female wings average 25.8 cm (10.2 in) and tails 18.5 cm (7.3 in). Data for the two island subspecies is limited, but males of subspecies colei have been measured at 360 and 398 g (12.7 and 14.0 oz) with 26 cm (10 in) wings on average, and a female at 335 g (11.8 oz) with a 24 cm (9.4 in) wing, and subspecies parvior at 370–410 g (13–14 oz) for males with 26 cm (10 in) wings on average, and 308 g (10.9 oz) and 25 cm (9.8 in) wing for a female. The sexes are similar in plumage, which is all black except for white patches at the tips of the wings and tail feathers. The bill and legs are black and the eyes bright yellow. The white tips line the trailing edges of the wings in flight, and a paler arc across the bases of the primary flight feathers is also visible on the underwing. Although there is no seasonal variation to the plumage, the black may fade a little to a dark brown with wear. Immature birds have browner-tinged plumage, and a yellow gape until they are two years old. The oldest recorded age of a black currawong has been 15 years; a bird was sighted in July 2004 near Fern Tree, Tasmania, less than 2 km (1.2 mi) from where it had been banded in July 1989.

=== Voice ===
The black currawong is a loud and vocal species, and makes a variety of calls. Its main call is markedly different from the pied or grey currawongs and has been described as a combination of alternating kar and wheek sounds, killok killok, or even akin to part song and part human laughter. Although often noisy when flying in flocks, it can be silent when seeking prey or thieving food. Before or around dawn and at nightfall appear to be periods of increased calling, and birds are reported to be more vocal before rain or storms. Parents also make a long fluting whistle to summon their young.

=== Similar species ===
The black currawong is commonly confused with the clinking currawong, but the latter species has a white rump and larger white wing patches. The black currawong has a heavier bill and a characteristic call unlike the clink-clink call of the clinking. The forest and little ravens are similar in size but lack the white wing patches, and instead have entirely black plumage and white, rather than yellow eyes. The black currawong is unlikely to be mistaken for the closely related pied currawong as the latter does not reach Tasmania, but it has a longer and deeper bill and lacks the white rump and undertail coverts.

== Distribution and habitat ==
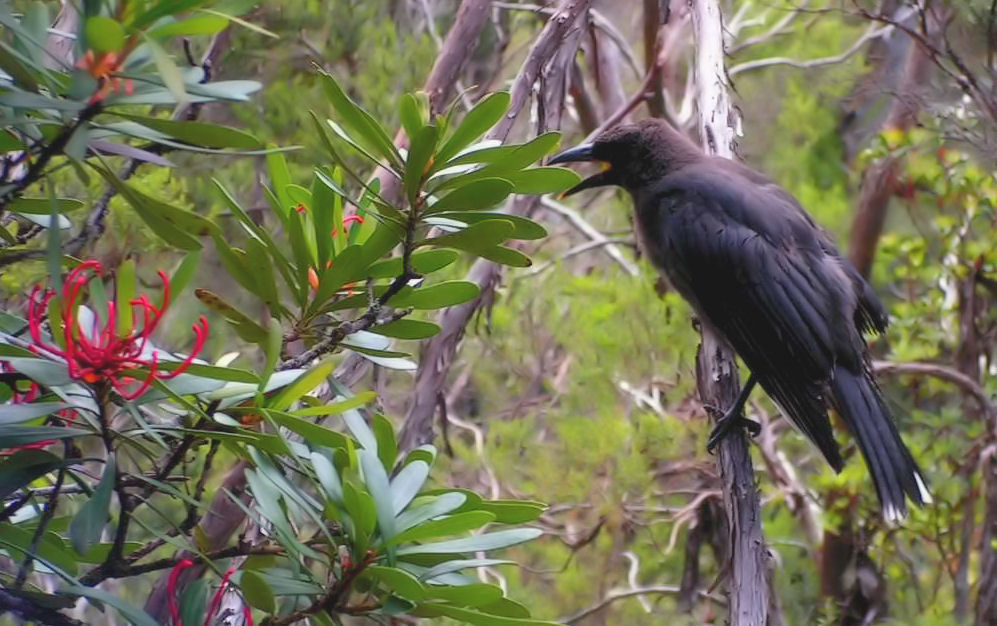
Juvenile black currawong, Cradle Mountain

The black currawong is endemic to Tasmania where it is widespread, although it is uncommon or absent from areas below 200 m (660 ft) altitude. It breeds mainly in the Central Highlands, with scattered records elsewhere in Tasmania. Reports of breeding are rare from the northeast. It is found on many islands of Bass Strait, including the Hunter and Furneaux Groups. It was recorded historically from the Kent Group, but its status there is unknown. Within its range it is largely sedentary, although some populations at higher altitudes may move to lower altitudes during winter. Flocks have also been recorded making the 20 km (12 mi) long journey across water from Maria Island to the mainland in the morning and returning at nightfall, as well as moving between islands in the Maatsuyker group. The black currawong has expanded into the northeast corner of the island, to Musselroe Bay and Cape Portland.

The black currawong is generally found in wetter eucalypt forests, dominated by such species as alpine ash (Eucalyptus delegatensis), messmate (E. obliqua), and mountain gum (E. dalrympleana), sometimes with a beech (Nothofagus) understory. It also frequents cool rainforest of beech, king billy pine (Athrotaxis selaginoides). In lowlands it is more restricted to denser forests and moist gullies, while it also occurs in alpine scrubland and heathland at altitude. In dryer more open forest, it is replaced by the clinking currawong, although the two may co-occur in places such as the Central Highlands and Eastern Tiers. Both the Flinders and King island subspecies are found across their respective islands, but prefer more forested habitats there. The black currawong has been recorded in gardens in Hobart in Tasmania's southeast, and around Mount Wellington, on Hobart's outskirts, in winter. Some remained to breed in Hobart in 1994 after a year of severe weather.

== Behaviour ==
Black currawongs are found singly or in pairs, but may gather into groups of 20 to 80 birds. Birds have been observed digging wet yellow clay out of a drain and applying it all over their plumage. Wiping the carpal areas of wings in particular with their bills, they did not appear to wash afterwards, using the procedure as a form of dirt bath. The black currawong has an undulating flight pattern in time with its wing beats, and often cocks its tail in the air for balance when it lands. Play behaviour has been observed, particularly with subadult individuals. Black currawongs have been observed wrestling with each other, where a bird would attempt to force its opponent on its back, at Maydena, Tasmania, while others have been reported rolling on their backs and juggling with food items such as pears with their feet.

One species of chewing lice, Australophilopterus curviconus, has been recovered and described from a black currawong near Launceston.

=== Breeding ===
Breeding occurs from August to December. Like all currawongs, it builds a large cup-nest out of sticks, lined with softer material, and placed in the fork of a tree from 3 to 20 m (9.8 to 65.6 ft) high. Old nests are sometimes tidied up and reused in following years. A typical clutch has two to four pale grey-brown, purplish-buff, spotted, blotched red-brown or purplish-brown eggs. As in all passerines, the chicks are born naked, and blind (altricial), and remain in the nest for an extended period (nidicolous). Both parents feed the young, but the male feeds them alone after leaving the nest and as they become more independent, and also moves from giving food directly to them to placing it on the ground near them so they learn to eat for themselves.

=== Feeding ===
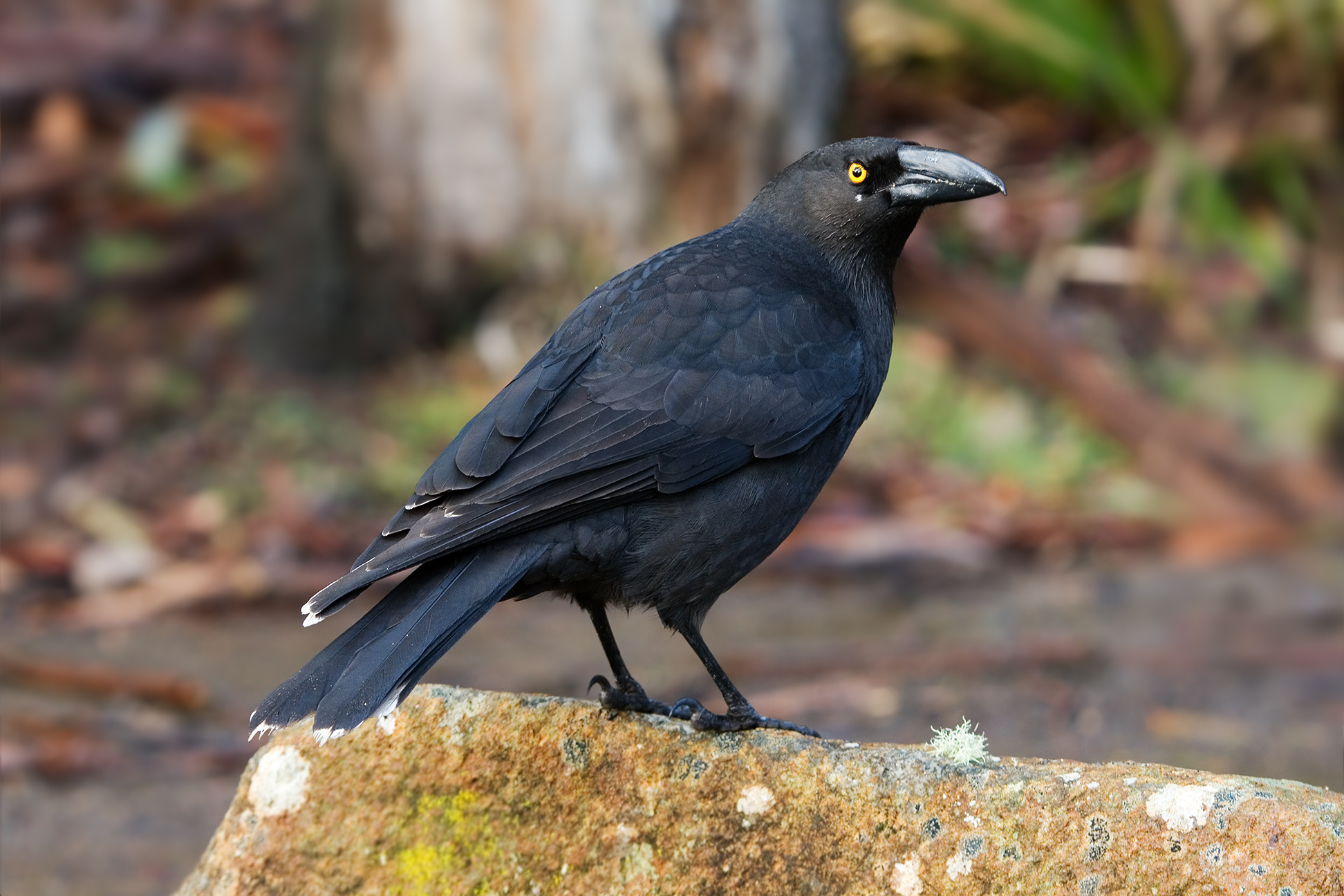
Black currawong, Fortescue Bay, Tasman Peninsula

No systematic studies have been done on the diet of the black currawong, but it is known to be omnivorous, feeding on a wide variety of foodstuffs including insects and small vertebrates, carrion, and berries. Birds often forage on the ground but also in tree canopies. They use their bills to probe the ground or turn over clods of earth or small rocks looking for food. Birds have been seen using walking tracks to forage. A group of ten birds were observed trying to break open ice on a frozen lake. They have been recorded foraging along the beach for fly larvae in beached kelp. Most commonly, black currawongs forage in pairs, but they may congregate in larger groups—flocks of 100 birds have descended on orchards to eat apples or rotten fruit. The species has been observed in a mixed-species flocks with forest ravens (Corvus tasmanicus), and silver gulls (Chroicocephalus novaehollandiae), white-faced herons (Egretta novaehollandiae), white-fronted chats (Epthianura albifrons), and European starlings (Sturnus vulgaris) on the beach at Sundown Point. They have been observed securing dead larger prey to ease subsequent dismemberment; a parent currawong had wedged a dead chicken's wings under a log to facilitate pulling off portions such as legs and entrails to feed to its young, and another time hooked a dead rabbit on a spur of a log to rip it into pieces.

The black currawong consumes the berries of the species in the heath genus Leptecophylla, as well as Astroloma humifusum, and the native sedge Gahnia grandis, as well as domestic pea, and apples. Invertebrates consumed include earthworms (Lumbricidae) and many types of insects, such as ants, moths, flies, crickets, grasshoppers and beetles like weevils, scarabs and leaf beetles. It is adaptable, and has learnt to eat the introduced European wasp (Vespula germanica). A bird that was being harassed by three scarlet robins (Petroica boodang) was seen to turn on them and catch and eat one suddenly. Other vertebrates recorded as prey include the house mouse (Mus musculus), small lizards, tadpoles, chickens, ducklings, the young of domestic turkey, Tasmanian nativehen (Tribonyx mortierii), flame robin (Petroica phoenicea) and rabbit.

It can become quite bold and tame, much like its close relative, the pied currawong on the Australian mainland, especially in public parks and gardens where people make a habit of feeding it. Black currawongs have been recorded taking young peas from pods, raiding orchards, seizing chickens from poultry yards, and entering barns in search of mice.

Black currawongs are very common around picnic areas in Tasmania's two most popular National Parks, Freycinet and Cradle Mountain-Lake St Clair, and are often fed by tourists there. The National Parks Authority tolerated this practice until 1995 when they found the birds were becoming a nuisance and began discouraging people from feeding wildlife. However, the agile currawongs are adept at snatching fragments of food left by picnickers so the birds may only ultimately be discouraged by an (impractical) ban on food in National Parks. Birds also take other items such as soap or cutlery from campsites to examine.

== Conservation status ==
Despite its small range, the black currawong is unlikely to meet the range size criteria for vulnerable. The population trend appears to be stable, and even though the population size has not been quantified, it is unlikely to approach the susceptible thresholds under the population size criterion (10,000 mature individuals with a continuing decline estimated to be greater than 10 percent in ten years or three generations, or with a specified population size), and the International Union for Conservation of Nature evaluated it as least concern. One of its subspecies, Strepera fuliginosa colei of King Island, has declined over much of its range on King Island, possibly due to clearing of its forest habitat, and has been listed as vulnerable. There are estimated to be around 500 birds. It is unclear whether competition with the more numerous forest raven is impacting on the subspecies there.
