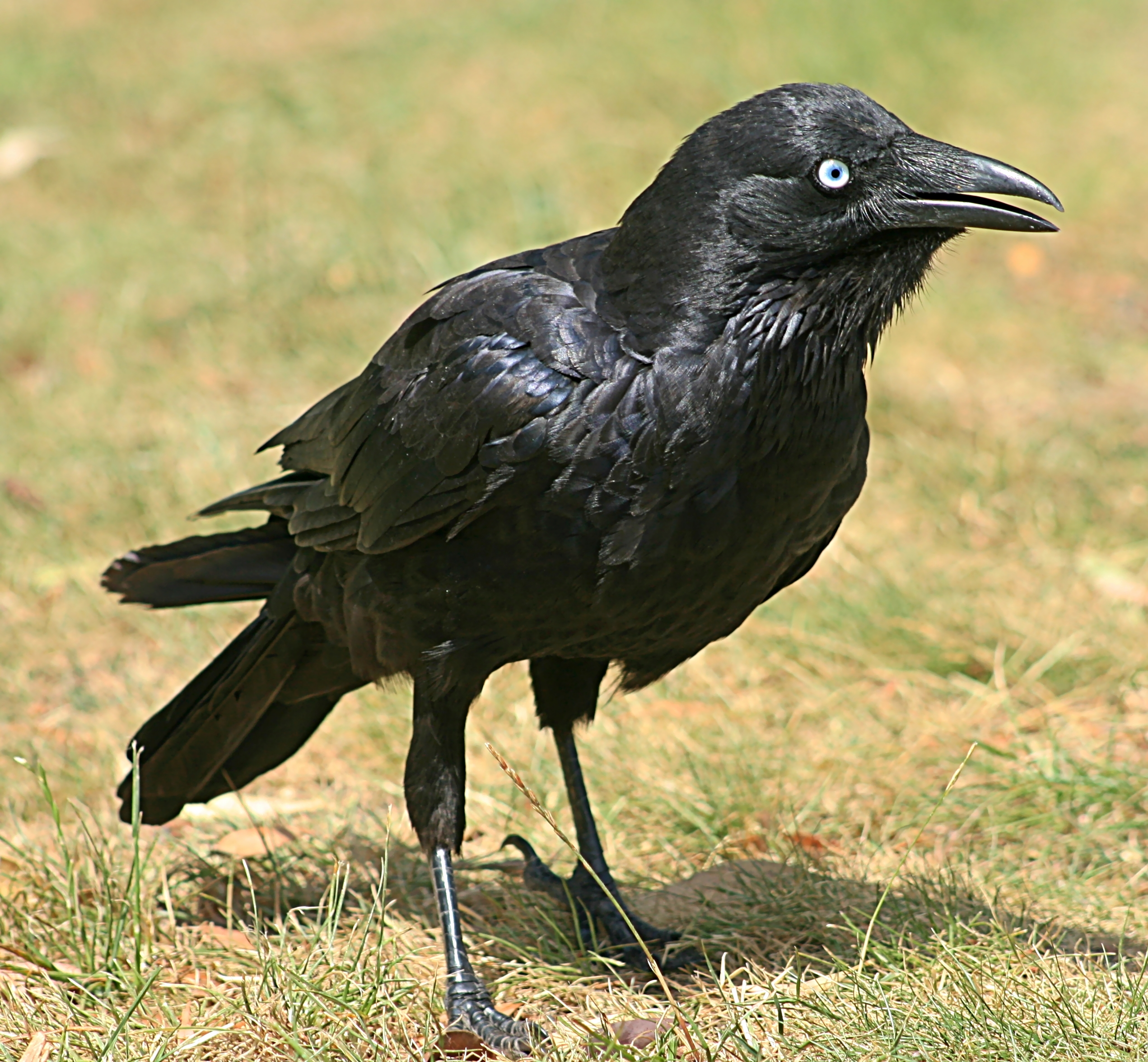
- Near Thredbo, New South Wales

Conservation status
- Least Concern (IUCN 3.1)

Scientific classification
- Kingdom: Animalia
- Phylum: Chordata
- Class: Aves
- Order: Passeriformes
- Family: Corvidae
- Genus: Corvus
- Species: C. mellori

Binomial name
- Corvus mellori Mathews, 1912
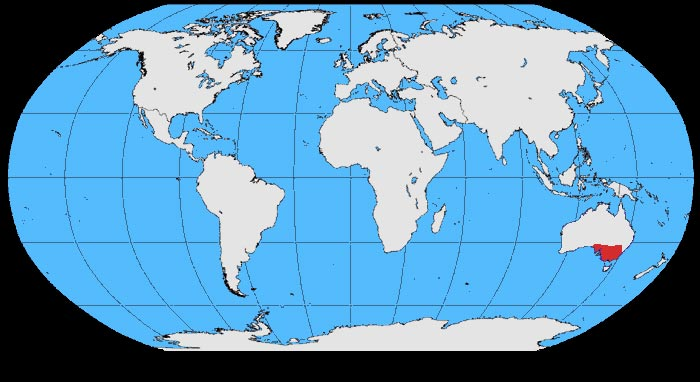
- Distribution map

= Little raven =

Species of bird

The little raven (Corvus mellori) is a species of the family Corvidae that is native to southeastern Australia. An adult individual is about 48–50 cm (19–19.5 in) in length, with completely black plumage, beak, and legs; as with all Australian species of Corvus, the black feathers have a grey base, and the iris of the adult bird is white (typical also of some related species from islands to the north of Australia). Although the little raven was first named by Gregory Mathews in 1912, it was only in 1967 that there was consensus to separate it from the Australian raven (C. coronoides) as a distinct species.

== Taxonomy ==
In the 1960s, the CSIRO were intensively studying Australian raven populations and their relationship to lambing and sheep in southeastern Australia. It became evident that there was a smaller species of raven living alongside the Australian raven. These birds lived in smaller trees, had smaller throat hackles and lacked the bare skin of their larger relative. They were also nomadic and made different calls. Ian Rowley investigated old scientific names assigned to type specimens and concluded that they matched Corvus mellori as described by Gregory Mathews in 1912 as a subspecies of Corvus marianae. The type specimen was collected from Angas Plains in South Australia in 1901. It disappeared in transit in 1966. It was named after John White Mellor who had worked on the birds of South Australia.

The little raven is closely related to the other four species of Australian corvid, which include the Torresian crow and little crow as well as the forest raven and Australian raven. Initial single gene genetic analysis of the genus using mitochondrial DNA showed the three raven species to belong to one lineage and the two crows to another. The genetic separation between species is small and there was a suggestion the little raven may be nested within the Australian raven, though the authors conceded more genetic work was needed. Subsequent multigene analysis using nuclear DNA by Jønsson and colleagues in 2012 showed the forest and little raven are each other's closest relatives, with the Australian raven an earlier offshoot.

Rowley proposed that the common ancestor of the five species diverged into a tropical crow and temperate raven sometime after entering Australia from the north. The raven diverged into the ancestor of the forest and little ravens in the east and Australian raven in the west. As the climate was cooler and drier, the aridity of central Australia split them entirely. Furthermore, the eastern diverged into nomadic little ravens as the climate became dryer and, in forested refuges, forest ravens. As the climate eventually became warmer, the western ravens spread eastwards and outcompeted forest ravens on mainland Australia but coexisted with little ravens.

Rowley proposed the name "little raven" for the new species, conceding it was generic but noting it was demonstrative, and that "little crow" had been adopted over "Bennett's crow" for Corvus bennettii. The name has since been designated the official name by the International Ornithologists' Union (IOC). The term "crow" is colloquially applied to any or all species of Australian corvid.

== Description ==
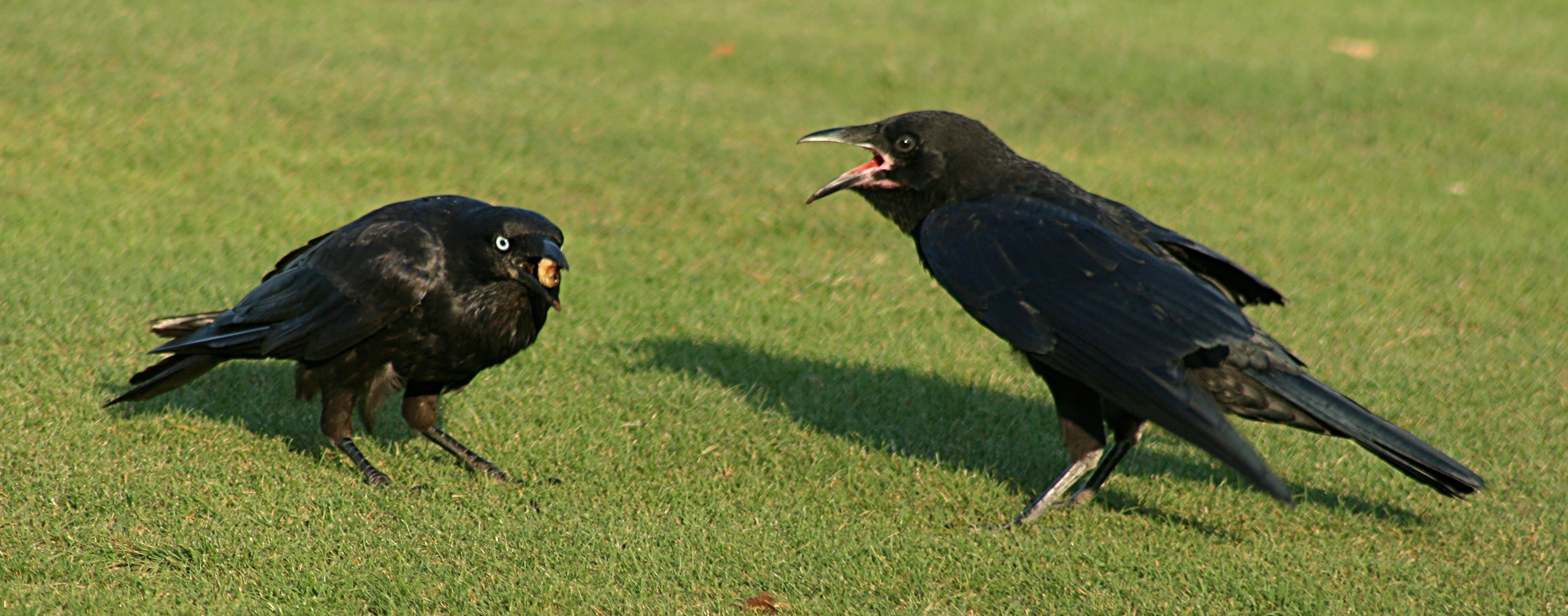
A juvenile (right) calls to be fed the grub its mother (left) has just caught.

The little raven is, at about 48–50 cm in length on average, somewhat smaller than the Australian raven (though sizes do overlap between both species), the little raven's beak is slightly smaller. The little raven is a somewhat more sociable species than the Australian raven, often forming large flocks that roam freely over wide areas in search of food.

Eye colour varies with age: nestlings up to three months old have blue-grey eyes, juveniles aged from three to eleven months have brown eyes, and immature birds have hazel eyes with blue eyerings around the pupil until age one year and eleven months. (Note: Rowley and colleagues recorded iris colour changes of all five Australian corvid species raised in captivity.) The eyes turn white when the birds mature into adults.

=== Vocalisations ===
Its call is a harsh, guttural "kar-kar-kar-karrr" or "ark-ark-ark-arrk" with a similarly drawn-out call to the Australian and forest raven. Like all species of raven in Australia (with the exception of the forest raven) the little raven sometimes stretches or flicks its wings outward slightly when calling. Like all corvids, the little raven is capable of vocal mimicry, but this behavior is mostly recorded in captivity and only rarely in the wild.

== Distribution and habitat ==
The little raven ranges over southeastern Australia from southern South Australia, Victoria and New South Wales. Also in Kangaroo Island (S.A) and King Island (Bass Strait). Living within scrub, agricultural areas, grazing pasture, woodlands to treeless plains, coasts, and suburbs.

Little ravens are absent from west Gippsland, where the land is dominated by forest ravens.

Its large range, abundance and stable population mean it is classified as least concern on the IUCN Red List.

The little raven appears to have become more abundant and widespread in Melbourne since the 1980s, spreading northwards and westwards, adapting well to its urban surrounds. Meanwhile, the Australian raven has only been rarely recorded in the city's outer fringes. The opposite phenomenon has taken place in Canberra and Sydney, where it is the Australian raven that has adapted and become common, while the little raven has remained uncommon.

== Behaviour ==
=== Breeding ===
Little ravens often nest in a loose colony of up to fifteen pairs, with nests few metres apart. They are closer together as the territories are for breeding only and not feeding, which is more communal. They have often been recorded as having several nests within the nesting territory of a single Australian raven which, presumably due to different food preferences, does not seem to consider them a threat to its own food resources. Cover does not appear to be important as dead trees with bare branches are used.

The nest is a thin cup of sticks with a layer of bark, grass and wool to create a thick mat. Nests are commonly low to the ground (under 10 meters), often in a forked branch in the outer canopy of a tree. Nests in urban Melbourne have been increasingly found at greater distances above the ground, as have nests in areas where Australian ravens do not occur, suggesting that the lower nests eventuated when the little raven was in competition with its larger relative. Nests on the ground have been reported. Building the nest is often time-consuming initially as the birds try (and often fail) to wedge sticks into the tree fork to make a platform. Thinner sticks and rootlets are used to make the bowl before the bowl is lined with feathers. Both birds build the nest, with the female taking over the lining of the nest while the male brings her material. New nests are built each year generally, as the re-use of old ones might spread disease or parasites—nests become caked with faeces as the nestlings grow and the parents cannot keep up with its removal. Old nests often disintegrate within twelve months anyway due to their exposed locations.

A clutch can comprise up to six eggs, though usually four or five are laid, with four being the commonest number. Eggs are quite variable and cannot be reliably identified as to which Australian corvid laid them, however the colouration of the two crow species eggs is different from the three ravens. Ravens' eggs are a light turquoise with brown blotches, but crows' eggs are a dirty white with brown speckles.

They leave the nest at 33–41 days of age.

=== Feeding ===
Little ravens eat more insects than C. coronoides and feed mainly on the ground, but they are probably omnivorous to a similar extent to other Corvus species when opportunity arises. Common invertebrates eaten include spiders, millipedes, centipedes (which ravens behead before eating), grasshoppers, cicadas and caterpillars (especially of the family Noctuidae), which are important in feeding nestlings. Little Ravens have also been observed predating upon little penguin nests on Phillip Island, where large individual little ravens were found to be more capable of raiding the penguin nests.

Little ravens are intelligent birds, and have been recorded using tools as well as having innovative methods of seeking out food.
