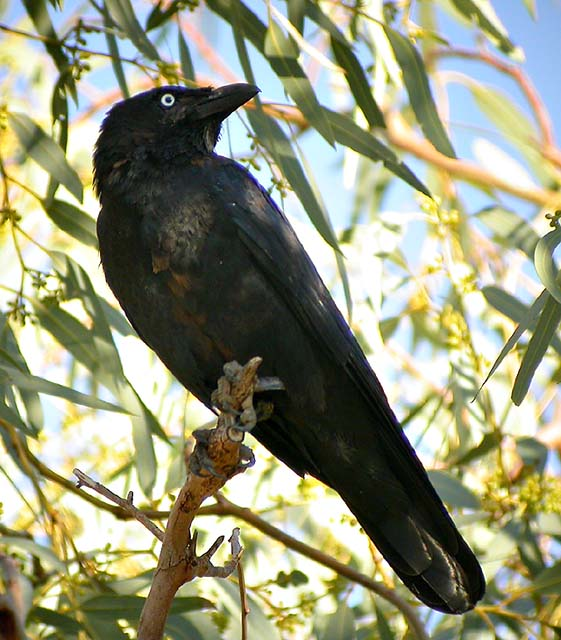

Conservation status
- Least Concern (IUCN 3.1)

Scientific classification
- Kingdom: Animalia
- Phylum: Chordata
- Class: Aves
- Order: Passeriformes
- Family: Corvidae
- Genus: Corvus
- Species: C. bennetti

Binomial name
- Corvus bennetti North, 1901
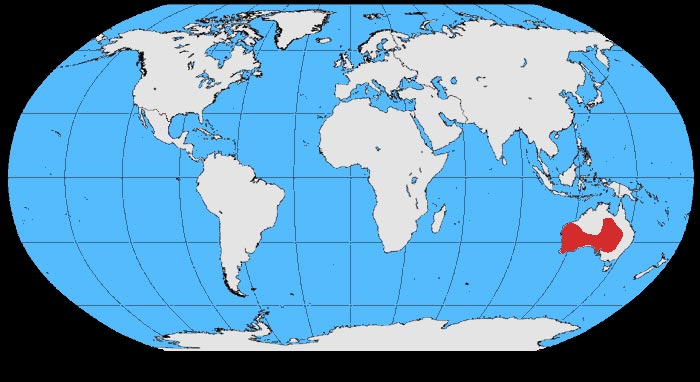

= Little crow (bird) =

Species of bird

The little crow (Corvus bennetti) is an Australian species of crow, very similar to the Torresian crow in having white bases to the neck and head feathers (shown when ruffled in strong wind) but slightly smaller (38–45 cm in length) and with a slightly smaller bill. It has the same white iris that distinguish the Australian species from all other Corvus except a few island species to the north of Australia. The western jackdaw (now Coloeus monedula) shares that trait; but while formerly considered members of Corvus, the jackdaws are now commonly put into their own genus Coloeus. Like the Australian raven, the little crow has a blue ring around the pupil.

== Distribution and habitat ==
It ranges over western and central Australia, often inhabiting very dry, near desert areas. It frequents small country towns and cultivated areas, where its flocks have reminded people of the European rook.

== Etymology ==
C. bennetti was named in honour of the New South Wales ornithologist and collector of natural history specimens, Kenric Harold Bennett.

The Gamilaraay and Yuwaalaraay people of northern New South Wales refer to this species by the names waagaan and waagiyan respectively.

== Behaviour ==
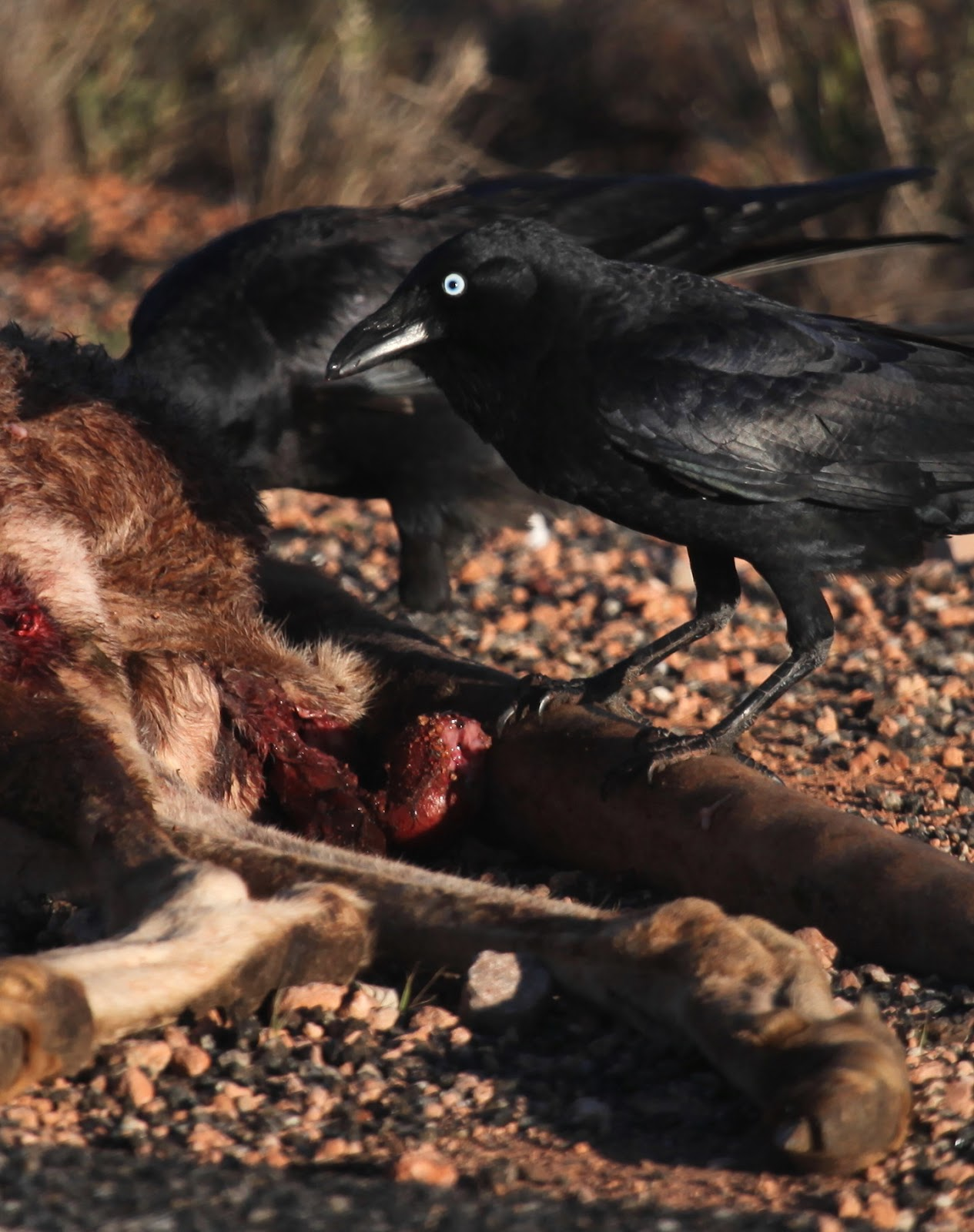
Little crows eating roadkill

=== Diet ===
Its food is mainly taken from the ground and includes insects, cereals and other seeds. It is less of a scavenger than the Torresian crow.

=== Nesting ===
It usually nests in small, loose colonies, building stick nests lined with mud (the only Australian species of Corvid known to do this).

=== Call ===
The little crow's calls range from a harsh hark-hark-hark-hark to a more raven-like ah-ah-ah.
