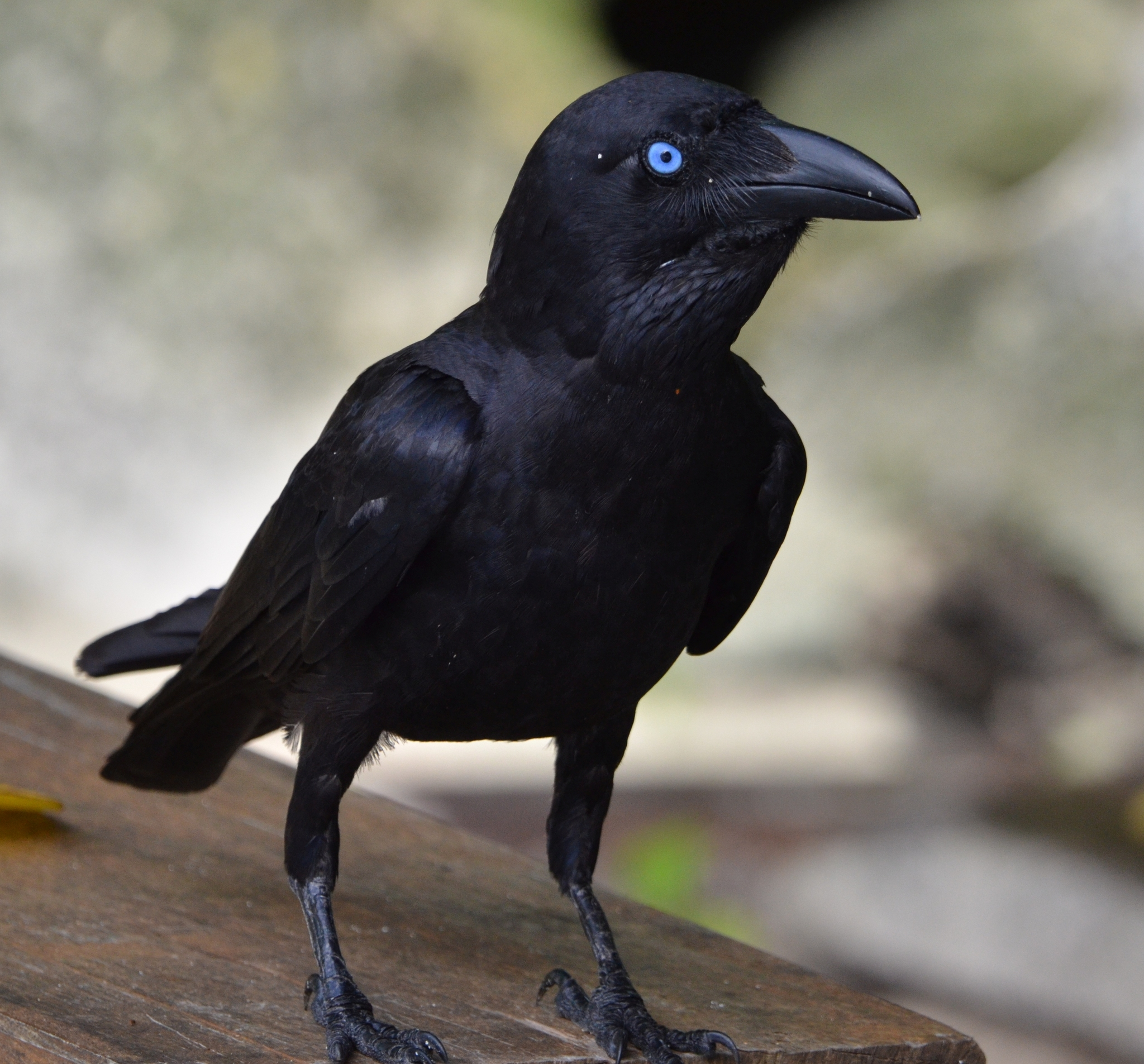

Conservation status
- Least Concern (IUCN 3.1)

Scientific classification
- Kingdom: Animalia
- Phylum: Chordata
- Class: Aves
- Order: Passeriformes
- Family: Corvidae
- Genus: Corvus
- Species: C. insularis

Binomial name
- Corvus insularis Heinroth, 1903
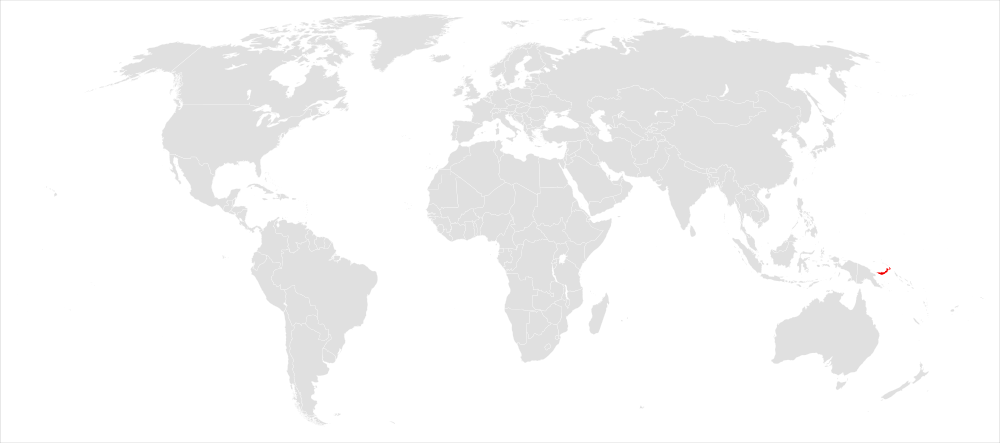

Synonyms
- Corvus orru insularis

= Bismarck crow =

Species of bird

The Bismarck crow (Corvus insularis) is a species of crow found in the Bismarck Archipelago. It was considered by many authorities to be a subspecies of the Torresian crow (C. orru), but is now treated as a distinct species.
