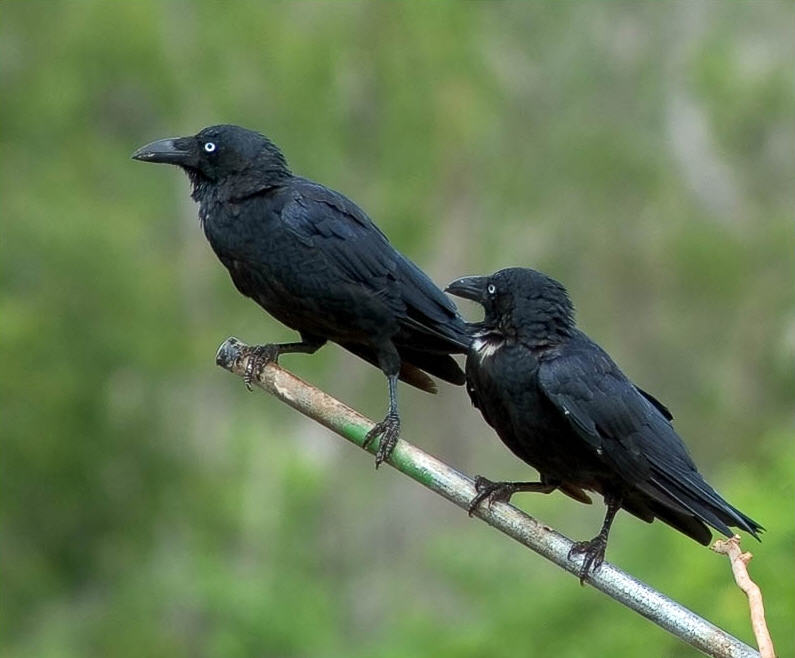

Conservation status
- Least Concern (IUCN 3.1)

Scientific classification
- Kingdom: Animalia
- Phylum: Chordata
- Class: Aves
- Order: Passeriformes
- Family: Corvidae
- Genus: Corvus
- Species: C. orru

Binomial name
- Corvus orru Bonaparte, 1850
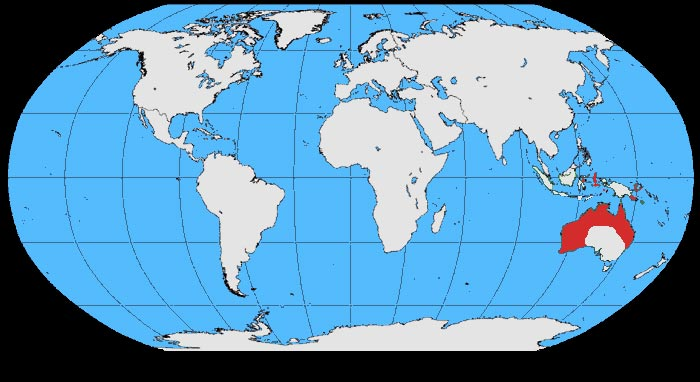

= Torresian crow =

Species of bird

The Torresian crow (Corvus orru), also called the Australian crow or Papuan crow, is a passerine bird in the crow family native to the north and west of Australia and nearby islands in Indonesia and Papua New Guinea. The species has a black plumage, beak and mouth with white irises. The base of the feathers on the head and neck are white. The Torresian crow is slightly larger with a more robust bill than the morphologically similar little crow.

Although widespread over northern Australia and some nearby islands, the common name "Torresian" refers to the Australian Shire of Torres.

== Taxonomy ==
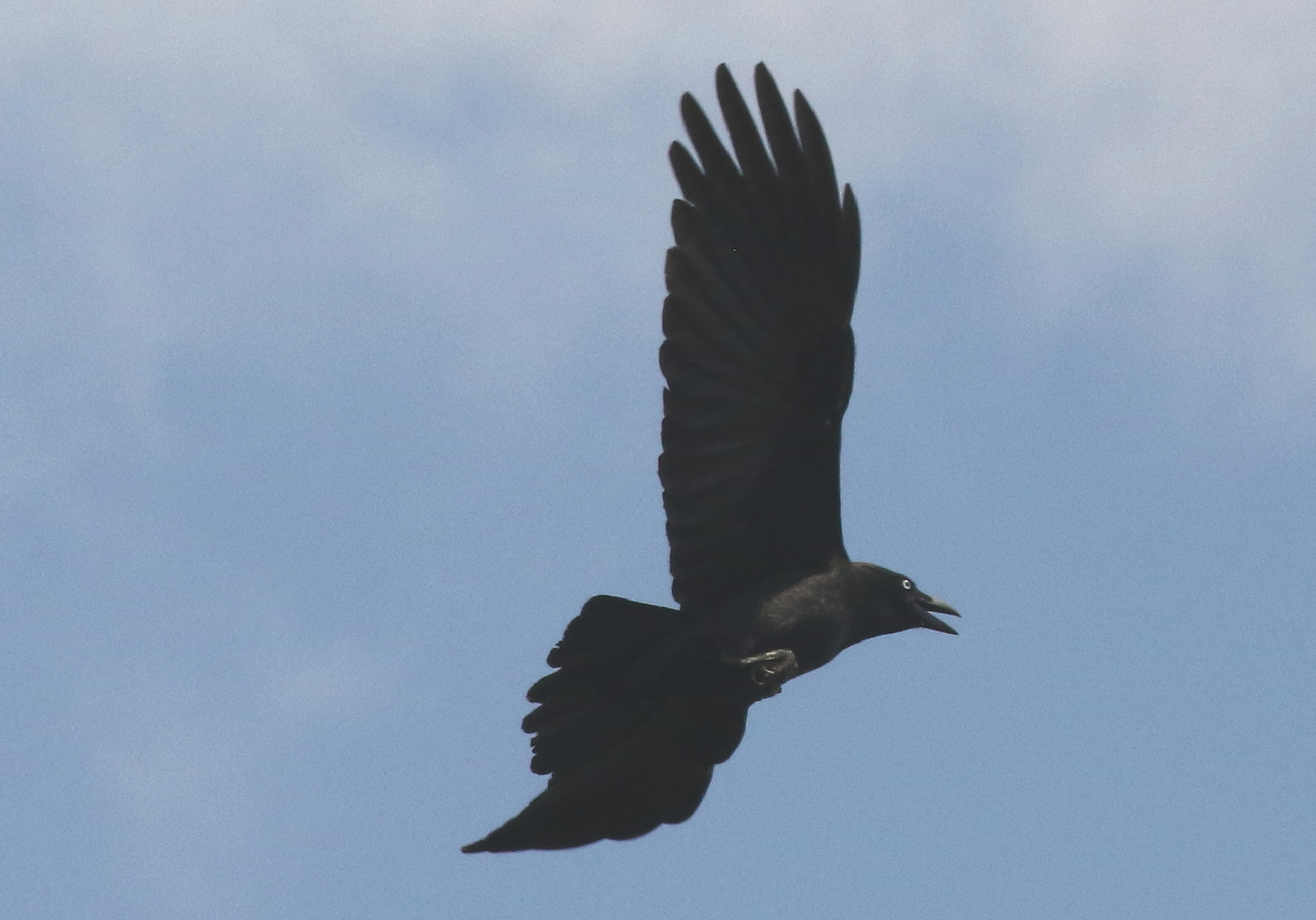
Near Beaudesert - Australia

The Torresian crow was described by the French ornithologist Charles Lucien Bonaparte in 1850 based on a specimen collected in New Guinea. The origin of the specific epithet orru is not known but may be derived from a Papuan name.

There are three subspecies:

- C. o. latirostris Meyer, AB, 1884 – east Lesser Sunda Islands
- C. o. orru Bonaparte, 1850 – Maluku Islands, New Guinea, D'Entrecasteaux Islands and Louisiade Archipelago
- C. o. cecilae Mathews, 1912 – west, central and northern Australia

The Bismarck crow (Corvus insularis) on the Bismarck Archipelago was formerly considered a subspecies. In Central Australia southwest of Alice Springs, the Pitjantjatjara term for race ceciliae is kaanka. The term wati kaanka refers to a light-fingered man or someone who hangs around suspiciously.

== Description ==
The Torresian crow is a large corvid, about the same size (48–53 cm in length) as the Eurasian carrion crow but with a more robust bill and slightly longer legs. The plumage of the Torresian crow is glossy black on the back and dull black on the breast with inconspicuous throat hackles. Its tail is broad and has a distinctive square-shaped tip. Its bill is dark grey and about the same length as the head. The legs and feet are a similar dark grey color with pink foot soles. The Torresian crow has the typical white iris of the other Australasian Corvus species with a fine, blue eye-ring. However, it can be distinguished from most except the little crow by the base of the head and neck feathers being white. The white feather bases are revealed when ruffled. Birds of this species characteristically shuffle their wings after alighting. Sexes are identical in their appearance; however, juveniles lack glossy dorsal feathers and have blue eyes, rather than white, up to about nine months of age.

The Torresian crow is not to be confused with the Australian raven the juveniles of which have a similar appearance. Adult ravens have distinctive long throat hackles which may not be visible in some postures. Despite their visual similarities, the Australian raven and crow have different and unique calls.

== Distribution and habitat ==
The Torresian crow has an extensive distribution across Australia, Papua New Guinea in particular the Bismarck Archipelago and some islands in Indonesia, in particular the Moluccas. The range of the mainland Australian race C. orru ceciliae extends from the tropical north of Australia to as far south as Forster on the east coast of New South Wales and to between Geraldton and Norseman in South Western Australia.

The Torresian crow occupies almost any habitat within its geographic range where there is a permanent source of water. The species is common in habitats such as tropical rainforests, eucalyptus woodland, open scrub, beaches, swamps, offshore islands. The Torresian crow is also well adapted to fringe habitats including farmland, towns and cities. On farms in much of Northern Australia, they are the most numerous bird species and are considered a pest by farmers, as they damage crops such as sweetcorn, peanuts, wheat and many kinds of fruit. Torresian crows are common in urban landscapes and many cities and towns in Australia support large populations. In the arid zones of central Australia, the species is sparsely distributed and confined to areas with permanent water.

Two other races occur on various islands to the north: C. orru orru in Papua New Guinea and the Moluccas), and C. orru latirostris on Tanimbar and Babar Islands.

== Ecology ==
=== Expansion of the Torresian crow population in Australia ===
The Torresian crow, similarly to many corvids, is an opportunistic species and has adapted to a broad range of habitats. The population size of Torresian crows in Australia is increasing, possibly owing to the expansion of agricultural activity in arid areas, as well as increased urbanization. Studies on the distribution of Torresian Crows across Australia, between 1993 and 2004, have shown that the geographic range of the species has expanded into highly urbanized regions including many of Australia's largest cities, as well as further south into arid areas of central Australia. The continued urban growth of Australia in the past decades has resulted in large areas of natural subtropical and eucalypt sclerophyll forest to be replaced by suburbs and parkland, especially in the regions surrounding major cities. This increased urbanisation of land has been associated with the observed proliferation of Torresian crows. Over a long-term study in urban to suburban areas of South-East Queensland, the abundance of Torresian crows was observed to have increased by about 40%. The density of the species in Brisbane has become such that the noise resulting from the congregation of large numbers of individuals in communal roosting sites located in urban areas, has become a source of complaints by local residents.

The population of Torresian crows has also expanded in rural areas across Australia. Increased development of land for agricultural activities is likely to be a significant factor influencing the rising population size of the species outside urban areas. In rural areas, Torresian crows have been found to congregate in agricultural environments and form large flocks. Since the species is reliant on a permanent source of water for their survival, large groups of Torresian crows are most commonly observed on cultivated land in the tropics and in the East of the country where annual rainfall is relatively higher. Whilst the distribution of Torresian crows has expanded further across all of Australia, the density of the species in arid areas remains low due to a lack of sustainable water sources. In the arid centre, the species is primarily confined to localised areas where the amount of water in streams and waterholes is enhanced by high runoff in surrounding regions. However, the development of irrigation systems and wells by the cattle and farming industry may have provided the species with sufficiently stable sources of water to allow them to establish in areas that were previously untenable.

=== Edge species ===
The expansion of corvid species populations in urban areas worldwide is due to their ability to exploit edge habitats. This has allowed corvids including the Torresian crow to take advantage of urban growth by exploiting the associated increase in anthropogenic food resources and by dominating the resulting urban habitat, reducing the competition imposed by other species.

One of the reasons the Torresian crow is able to take advantage of increased urbanisation is its diet; a significant proportion of the diet of the species consists of carrion, which is abundant in urban environments due to road kill. Anthropogenic waste also provides Torresian crows with a plentiful source of food requiring minimal foraging. Furthermore, food resources of the Torresian crow may be indirectly supplemented by the modification of land coverage, where native forests are replaced by lawns and parkland that are rich in invertebrates which also represent a significant part of the species' diet. The abundance of food means that little intra-specific aggression is observed since resources are not economically defensible. Finally, the large size of Torresian crows allows them to dominate food resources and hence experience little competition from other smaller urban bird species.

A second aspect allowing the Torresian crow to expand into urban areas is its breeding requirements. The species only requires very minimal breeding space making it well adapted to living in a dense urban landscape. This allows the formation of large communal roosts resulting in a high population density. Therefore, the carrying capacity of urban habitats for Torresian crows is comparatively much higher than that of rural areas where resources are more limited.

The urban sprawl in Australia is continually creating new habitat for the species and is likely to be a strong contributing factor in the observed increase in population size. Even relatively small urban developments on previously untouched land can represent significant increases in breeding space for Torresian crows to colonize, given the large carrying capacity of these habitats.

== Behaviour ==
Like other corvids, Torresian crows are intelligent and adaptable and have been known to steal food from larger birds by working in teams, and to feed on poisonous prey without ingesting poison (see below) among other behaviours. Torresian crows are large and aggressive birds, with females displaying the more aggressive behaviour and dominating most other species except large birds of prey and the Australian magpie. They have been observed to attack larger birds of prey, particularly wedge-tailed eagles and most owl species in defence of their nest or territory. Smaller birds will therefore attack crows in defence of their nests, with willie wagtails and pied butcherbirds being notable examples. Noisy miners and Australian magpies are among the few birds that are successful in driving Torresian crows out of their territories, with the latter species being one of the smaller bird species that dominate and displace crows where they meet. Between the months of January and August, large groups of crows congregate and roam nomadically across farmlands, forests and city suburbs. These groups consist of crows of all ages; however, from September to December, many leave these flocks to breed in temporary territories, with the nomadic flock sizes reducing significantly to only young and old crows. Each pair of crows returns to the same territory each year, but territories may be taken over by other pairs from year to year.

=== Diet ===
Torresian crows are omnivores and consume a wide range of foods. Their diet varies significantly between habitats with birds living in urban environments relying to a greater extent on anthropogenically related food sources compared to those living in natural habitats. Outside urbanised areas, the diet of Torresian crows primarily consists of invertebrates, berries and carrion. Birds of this species have also been observed to take stranded fish on the seashore, roadkill, fruit, grain, smaller birds and rodents. In Northern Australia Torresian crows have developed a technique to kill and eat the introduced poisonous cane toad without ingesting the poison it secretes from its skin and poison glands on either side of its head, by flipping it onto its back. The crows only feed on the intestines and part of the thighs of the toad, thus avoiding the poison. This predation and consumption technique is culturally transmitted amongst crows of the species.

=== Nesting ===
The main breeding period occurs from August to January, with most eggs being laid in September and October. The stick nest is built high in a tree, usually a eucalypt, however other locations such as power pylons and tall buildings are occasionally chosen. Two to four eggs are laid which the female incubates for roughly twenty days and then is assisted by the male in rearing the chicks for around forty days until they leave the nest. Young Torresian crows then stay with their parents for several months after fledging, before joining the nomadic flock. Torresian crows aggressively defend their nest from goannas, snakes and birds of prey with aggressive dive-bombs. Dogs, cats and humans are also occasionally swooped in nest defence, however not nearly as aggressively as notorious species such as Australian magpies and masked lapwings.

=== Voice ===
Their voice is quite different from the Australian raven: whilst the more standard loud penetrating Australian raven/crow call "Fark! Fark!" may occur there is often a more nasal, metallic clattering "uk-uk-uk-uk-uk" or sometimes an "ok-ok-ok-ok" or "Ar-ar-argh", sometimes with an upward inflection, somewhat like a cat meow. This may be following the more standard call or may be delivered in isolation.
