= Nidifugous and nidicolous organisms =

Terms describing how long an organism stays at its birthplace

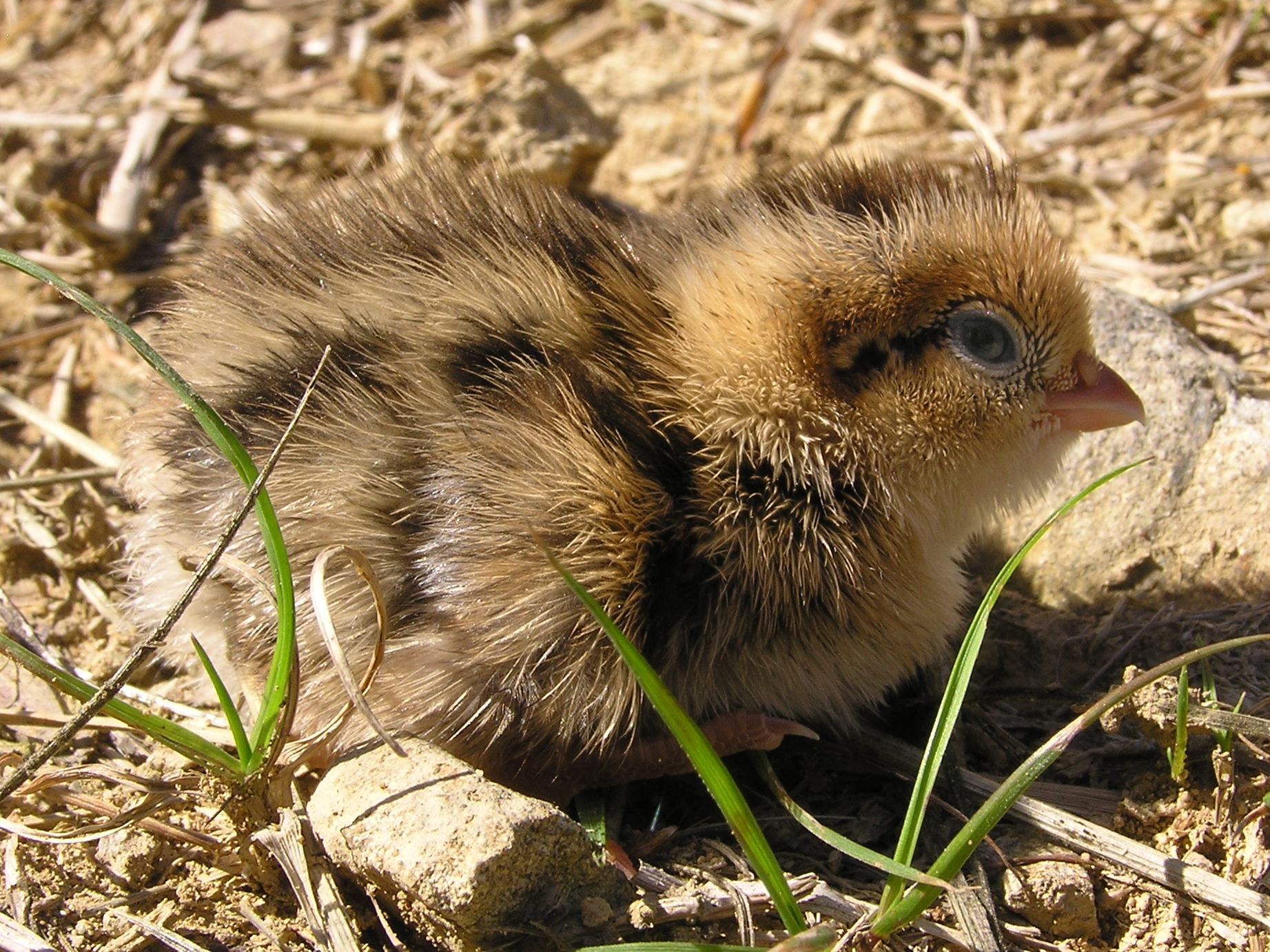
Nidifugous (Precocial)—California quail chicks.

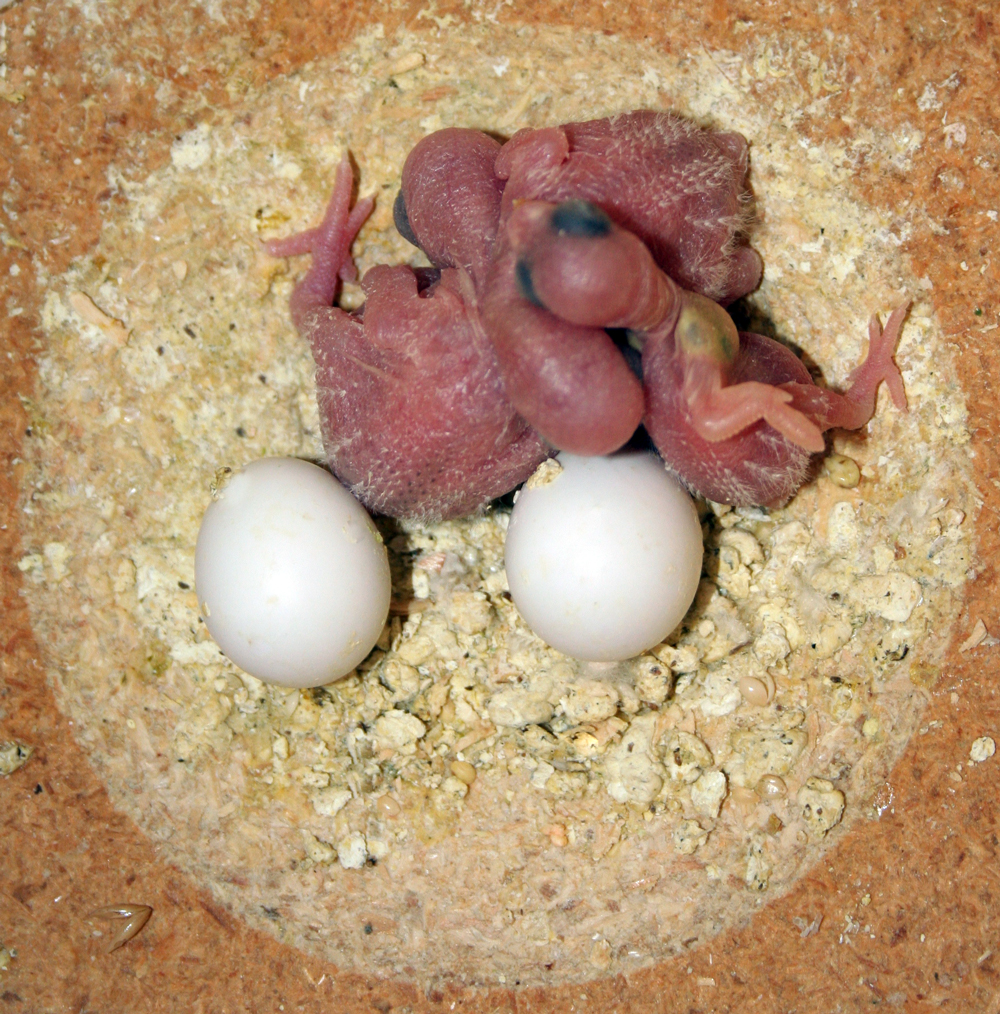
Nidicolous (Altricial)—The chicks and eggs of budgerigar

In biology, nidifugous (UK: /naɪˈdɪfjʊɡəs/ ny-DIF-yuu-gəs, US: /-jə-/ -yə-) organisms are those that leave the nest shortly after hatching or birth. The term is derived from Latin nidus for "nest" and fugere, meaning "to flee". The terminology is most often used to describe birds and was introduced by Lorenz Oken in 1816. The chicks of birds in many families, such as the waders, waterfowl, and gamebirds, are usually nidifugous.

The opposite of nidifugous organisms are nidicolous (/naɪˈdɪkələs/ ny-DIK-ə-ləs; from Latin nidus "nest" and -colus "inhabiting") organisms; a nidicolous organism is one which stays at its birthplace for a long time because it depends on its parents for food, protection, and the learning of survival skills. Examples of nidicolous species include mammals and many species of birds. During the life span, the brain of a nidicolous animal expands 8–10 times its initial size; in nidifugous animals, it expands from 1.5 to 2.5 times.

== Relation to precociality and altriciality ==
Two other terms are also used by scientists for related developmental phenomena: altricial (relatively undeveloped at birth or hatching; helpless, blind, without feathers or hair, and unable to fend for themselves) and precocial (relatively developed at birth or hatching; able to fend for themselves).

The term nidifugous is sometimes used synonymously with precocial, as all nidifugous species are precocial. Similarly, all altricial animals are nidicolous by necessity.

However, not all precocial birds leave the nest; some may stay at the nest even if they are precocial and fully capable of leaving if needed. These species are thus considered nidicolous rather than nidifugous. Examples of precocious but nidicolous species include many gulls and terns.

== See also ==
- Precociality and altriciality
- Parental investment
