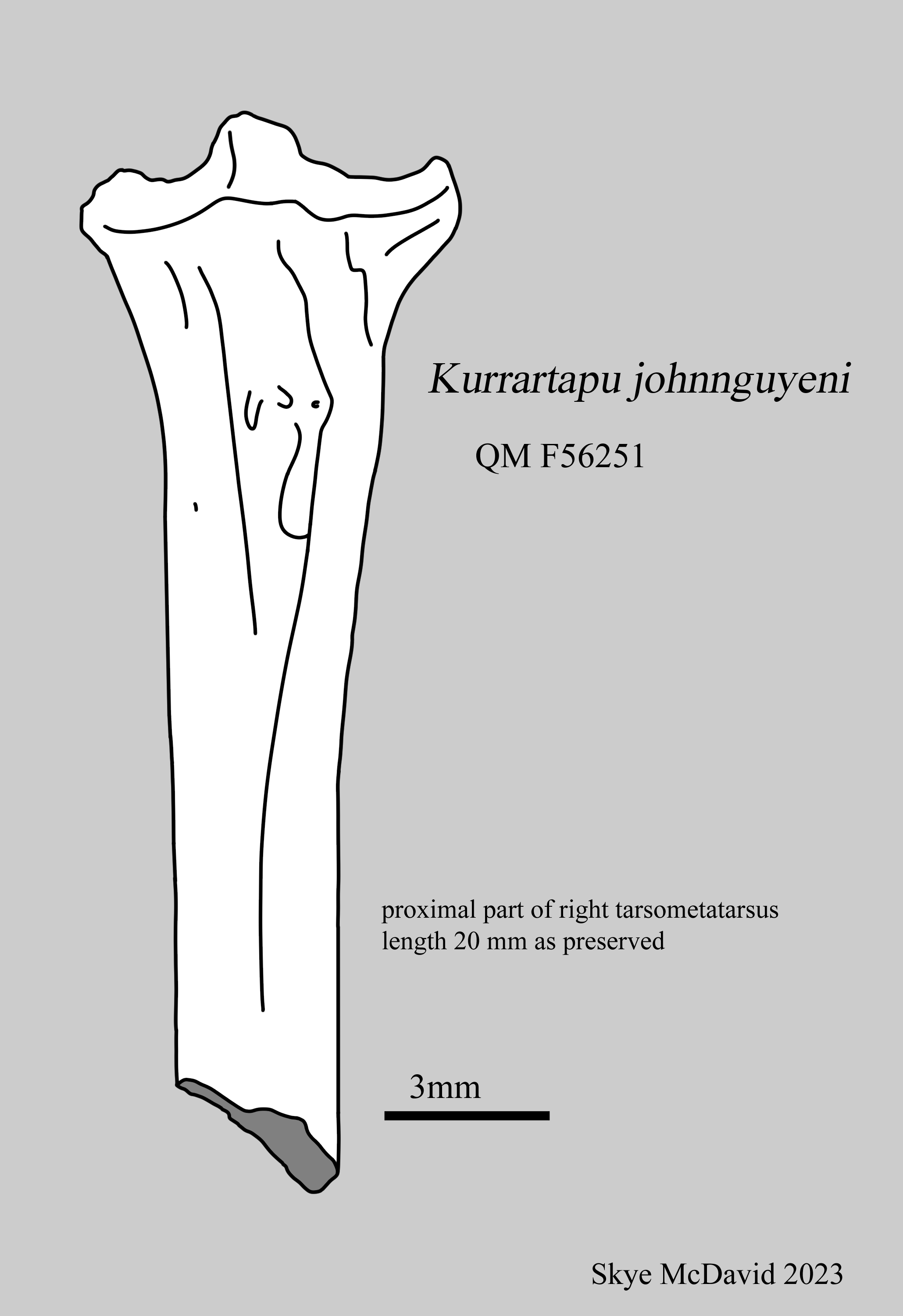
- Illustration of holotype tarsometatarsus

Scientific classification
- Kingdom: Animalia
- Phylum: Chordata
- Class: Aves
- Order: Passeriformes
- Family: Artamidae
- Subfamily: Cracticinae
- Genus: Kurrartapu; Nguyen, 2013
- Species: K. johnnguyeni

Binomial name
- Kurrartapu johnnguyeni Nguyen, 2013

= Kurrartapu =

Kurrartapu johnnguyeni Temporal range: Early Miocene 23–16 Ma

Extinct genus of birds

Kurrartapu johnnguyeni is an extinct species of bird in the Australian magpie and butcherbird family. It was described from Early Miocene material (a proximal tarsometatarsus) found at Riversleigh in north-western Queensland, Australia. It is the first Tertiary record of a cracticid from Australia. The size of the fossil material indicates that it was similar in size to the living black butcherbird. The generic name is a Kalkatungu language term for the Australian magpie. The specific epithet honours John Nguyen, the father of the senior describer.

== Description ==
Based on shared traits between the black butcherbird and Australian magpie it is possible that the Kurrartapu also shared their glossy dark feathers and had calls similar to modern currawongs. Contemporary cracticid colouration ranges from predominantly black with some white to gray. Round wings, like those of the black butcherbird and peltops, are typical of denser forest inhabitatants, and the closed rainforest that covered Australia in the early miocene make this trait far more likely than pointy wings, which are characteristic of other open-dwelling cracticids.

=== Bones ===
Regarding bones, the discovered proximal tarsometatarsus demonstrates similar elongation to that of the black butcherbird. This predates previously believed divergence between cracticids and the peltops and woodswallows. It is possible it also had a deep temporal fossa, as this trait is shared by black butcherbirds and Australian magpies today. The incomplete ossification found on the tarsometatarsi is an ancestral trait unique to the streptera-cracticus clade, for reference ossification of tendons in woodcreepers is shown to be adaptive for climbing, as ossification serves to reduce heavy wear and tear.

== Taxonomy ==
The genus Kurrartapu belongs to the family Cracticidae. Kurrartapu are more closely related to other members of Cracticidae than those of artamidae. Cracticids include currawongs, butcherbirds, and peltops. Cracticids are part of the assemblage Malaconotoidea within Corvoidea. Corvoidea are believed to have originated in Australasia. Other members of Malaconotoidea include the helmet shrikes, the batises, the vangas, the Asian ioras, the African bushshrikes, and the woodswallows. It is hypothesized that the last common ancestor of Artamidae, vangas, and cracticids (alive in the Paleogene) may have been stout with long pointy wings, a decurved bill, and sexually monomorphic.

The woodswallows are sometimes grouped within the family Cracticidae, though these two lineages may have diverged roughly 20-36.3 million years ago. This grouping is supported by morphological analyses and weakly supported by limited DNA studies, more comprehensive genetic analysis disproves this nesting, and so the two may be sister taxa. This remains disputed however, as recent mitochondrial phylogeny instead supports a sister relationship between cracticids and African bushshrikes and allies. Additionally the mottled berryhunter may be another sister taxa to cracticids.

Within the cracticids, the morphology of the tarsometatarsus suggests the Kurrartapu is more closely related to currawongs and butcherbirds, who diverged likely in the mid Miocene. The currawongs appear to have evolved earlier than the butcherbirds, which is possibly indicative as to which group shares more traits with the Kurrartapu.

== Distribution and habitat ==
The Kurrartapu fossil was found in the early Miocene deposit of Riversleigh. Australia then was experiencing the effects of the global warming phase which followed the melting of the polar ice caps. Plant and animal fossils also found in the deposit are closely related to extant rainforest (subtropical and tropical closed forest) dwelling species. During the early Miocene, fossils suggest central Australian lakes and swamps hosted sclerophyll forests, dominated by acacia, casuarina, and eucalyptus. In temperate rainforests, the canopy consisted mainly of coniferous podocorp and araucarian, and deciduous nothofagus trees, with an understory of tree ferns (predominately cyatheacean and dicksoniacean), along with a diversity of other flora. The rich diversity of the early miocene Australian forests approximates that of modern lowlands in Borneo. These forests were forever wet, and ranged between warm and cool temperatures. At this time (the early Miocene) Australia had broken off from Gondwana. This implies the Kurrartapu was restricted to the continent, and likely resided within the widespread rainforests aboard. Similar to the non-migratory black butcherbird, peltops, and extant Australian magpie one might assume the Kurrartapu was equally sedentary, although contemporary currawongs do undertake altitudinal migration.

=== Demise ===
The Kurrartapus likely diminished with the rainforest habitat loss accompanying increasing aridification and expansion of the savannas that occurred in the mid and late miocene. Gondwana's break-up and the movement of the continents altered ocean currents and precipitated the icehouse conditions that brought reduced rainfall, cool temperatures, and extinction to many lineages.

== Behaviour ==
Based on a comparison between currawongs and the Australian magpie, one might infer that Kurrartapus were also territorial and possibly flocked. It is likely they also cached food, as do the currawongs, butcherbirds, and Australian magpies. Based on membership to the cracticid taxa, it can be imagined that the Kurrartapu may have had lifespans which potentially exceeded 15 years, and took a year to reach sexual maturity. It is possible juvenile Kurrartapus were heavily dependent on their parents, and engaged in play like fellow cracticids. Engagement in play, along with passive mirror engagement (tapping, looking behind, investigating) and problem-solving abilities of butcherbirds evince the potential intelligence shared by the group. It is likely that Kurrartapus were hoppers, and navigated the ground by moving legs in parallel synchronization, as do butcherbirds and currawongs, although Australian magpies have developed bipedalism, able to walk and sprint.

=== Diet ===
Like other cracticids, they were probably predatory omnivores, generalists and active in the daytime, feeding mainly on invertebrates and carrion, though consuming smaller vertebrates and fruits as well. Observations of Australian magpie and pied-billed currawong diets show heavy invertebrate consumption (predominantly beetles, ants, moths, caterpillars, orthopterans, and spiders), though the pied-billed currawongs consumed fruit significantly as well.

=== Vocalizations ===
It can be hypothesized based on closest living relatives that the Kurrartapu had a similar call to present day currawongs. For example, the black currawong has a call that rises slightly, falls sharply and rises again dramatically, described as "kar-week-kar kar-week-week-kar" along with numerous croaks and whistles. In addition to the hypothesized relatedness distance based on bone morphology, the differing call of peltops may be even less relevant here as peltops are somewhat outliers to the cracticids, with behaviour similar to that of large flycatchers.

=== Reproduction ===
Cracticids are cooperative breeders, and maybe Kurrartapus exhibited this trait as well. It is possible that like other cracticids, they built cup shaped nests with twigs and grasses.
