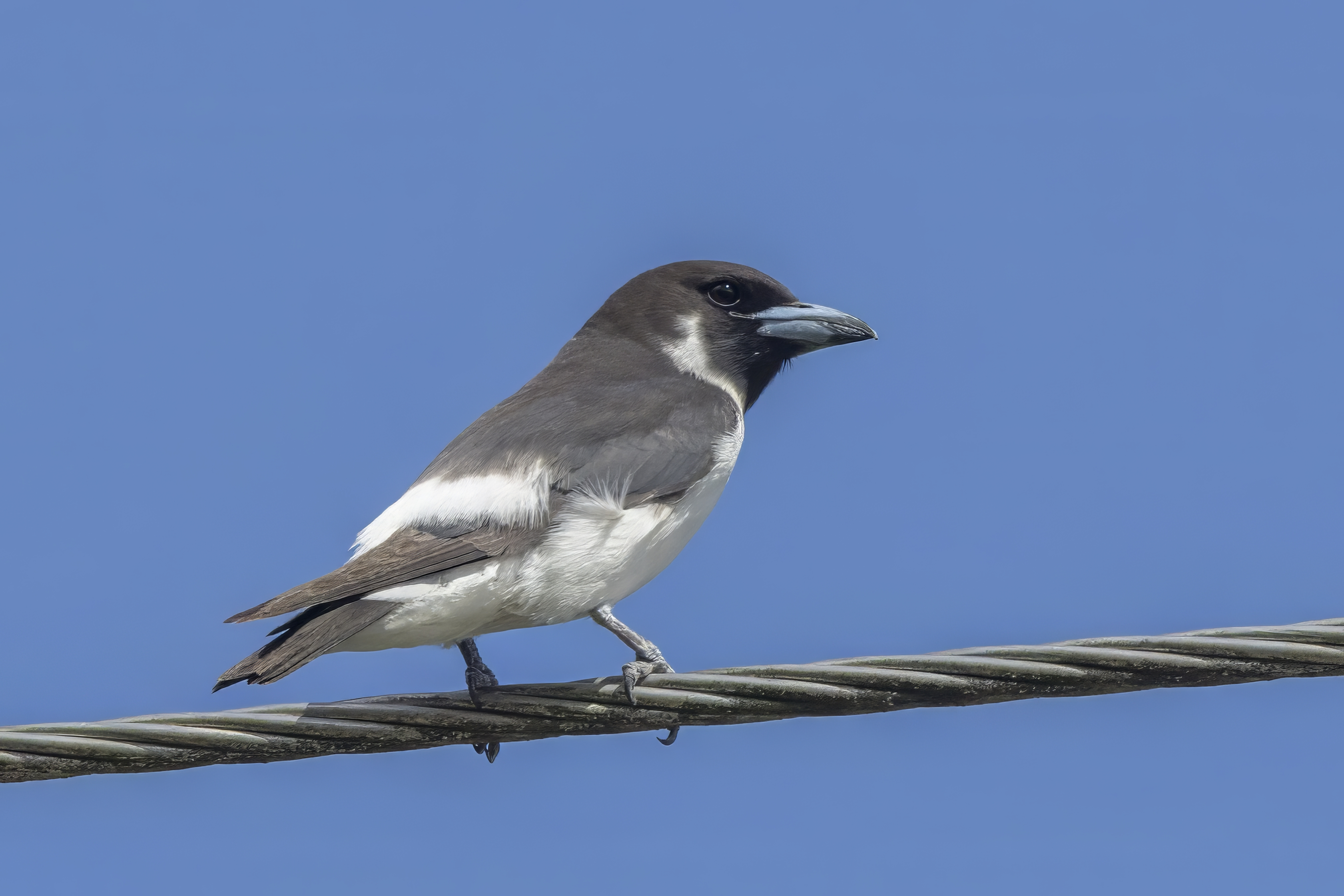
- On Taveuni

Conservation status
- Least Concern (IUCN 3.1)

Scientific classification
- Kingdom: Animalia
- Phylum: Chordata
- Class: Aves
- Order: Passeriformes
- Family: Artamidae
- Genus: Artamus
- Species: A. mentalis

Binomial name
- Artamus mentalis Jardine, 1845

Synonyms
- Artamus leucorynchus mentalis

= Fiji woodswallow =

Species of bird

The Fiji woodswallow (Artamus mentalis) is a species of woodswallow in the family Artamidae. It is endemic to most of the islands of Fiji, although it is absent from Kadavu Archipelago and the Lau Archipelago. The species was once considered a race of the white-breasted woodswallow, which breeds from Australia, New Caledonia and Vanuatu through to Borneo and the Philippines. Some authors retain it in that species.

The Fiji woodswallow is a chunky bird 18 centimetres (7 in) long with a heavy black-tipped blue bill. The plumage is sooty dark above, with a white belly, rump and throat. It is distinguished from the white-breasted woodswallow by the amount of white on the throat, which in the Fiji woodswallow comes up to the level of the bill.

== Distribution and habitat ==
The Fiji woodswallow is endemic to the major islands of Fiji, namely Viti Levu, Vanua Levu and Taveuni. It is absent from the fourth largest island, Kadavu, but is present on smaller Gau in the Lomaiviti Archipelago. Its natural habitat is tropical moist lowland forests and savannahs, but it has adjusted to human-altered habitats and also lives in cultivated areas; there are even urban populations in Suva and Nadi. In Viti Levu it is found in the highlands, but not on the highlands of Taveuni.

Unlike the nomadic populations of Australian white-breasted woodswallows, the Fiji woodswallow is sedentary. Family groups will occupy a tree in which they roost and nest in over several years. It is thought that this is because the climatic conditions in Fiji are less extreme.

== Diet ==
The Fiji woodswallow feeds on insects, with moths, butterflies, dragonflies, and grasshoppers being the main prey taken. Most of the prey is obtained by hawking, with birds sitting on prominent perches and sallying after flying insect prey. Prey is usually taken out in the open away from obstacles but is occasionally taken from near the ground. Alternatively the woodswallow may make sweeps over flowering plants and snap at insects. It seldom lands to catch prey. Smaller items of prey are swallowed whole, whereas larger items are taken to a perch and dismembered, with the insect held on the perch with a foot and pecked apart. The wings of some species, such as dragonflies, are often stripped off before swallowing.

Family groups will feed each other during the breeding season, and injured birds are fed while they recover.

== Social behaviour ==
Fiji woodswallows are highly social and will often form clusters on perches. At night groups habitually roost in the forks of a nesting/roosting tree, except during storms when they roost further down the tree.

Fiji woodswallows are preyed upon by the Fiji race of the peregrine falcon and the young are vulnerable to the Fiji goshawk. Fiji woodswallows are highly aggressive and will attack these raptors, often at risk to themselves, as well as introduced mammals such as cats and dogs. They will also harass the introduced common myna and red-vented bulbul to drive away from nesting and roosting sites, but display less aggression towards other harmless native species such as the Fiji parrotfinch.

== Breeding ==
A few studies of this species suggest that it has an unusual polygynandrous breeding system, in contrast to the white-breasted woodswallow, which is socially monogamous. Two males and two females have been observed building the nest, incubating the eggs and raising the young. It is not known if both the females lay or if only the dominant one does, but copulation has been recorded as occurring "indiscriminately" between different members of the group.

The nesting season begins in May, with nest building beginning then. Nest building is a communal activity, with all members of the group participating.
