= A. maximus =

A. maximus may refer to:

- Aepyornis maximus, an extinct aepyornithid bird species
- Artamus maximus, the Great Woodswallow, a bird species found in Indonesia and Papua New Guinea

== See also ==
- Maximus (disambiguation)
