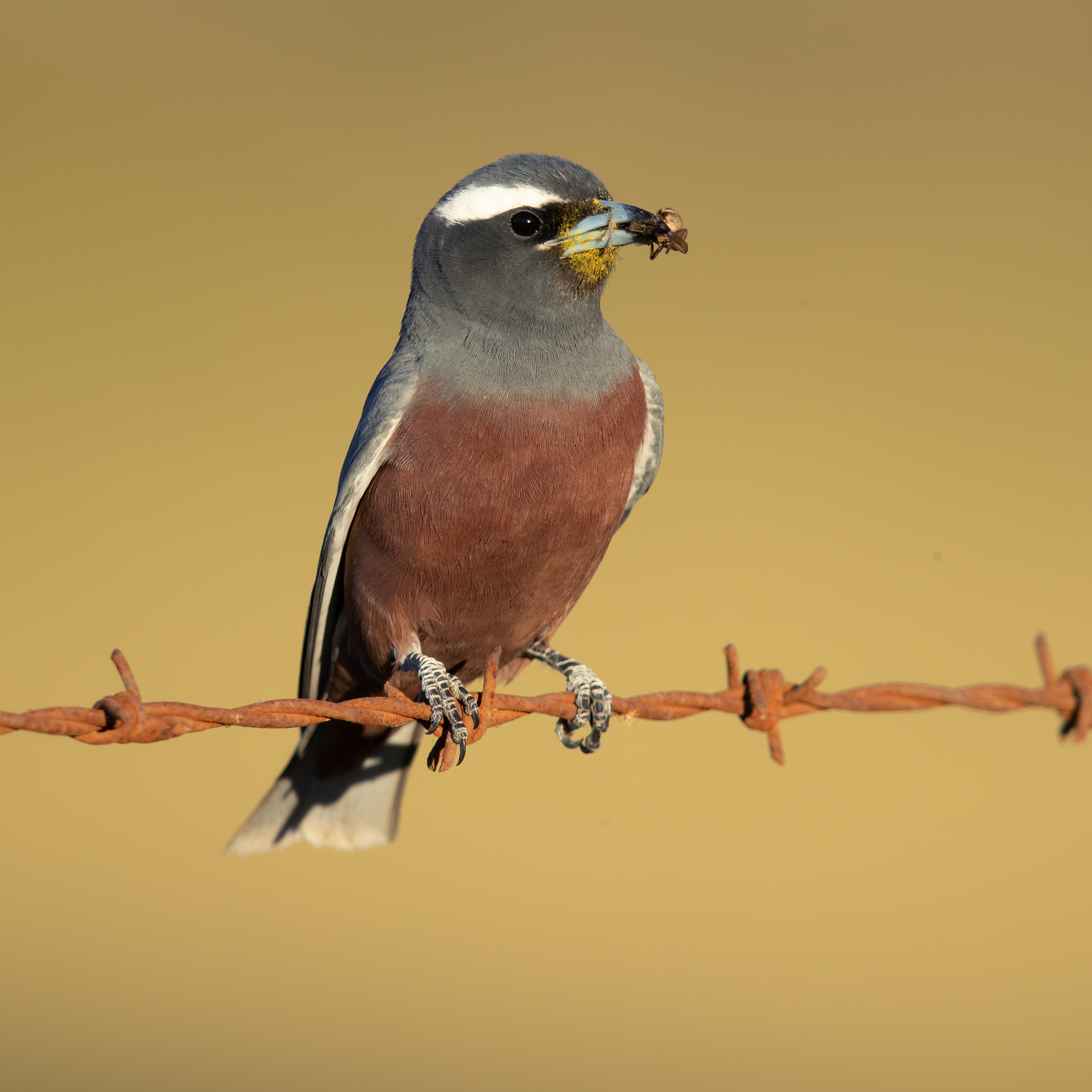
- male with spider
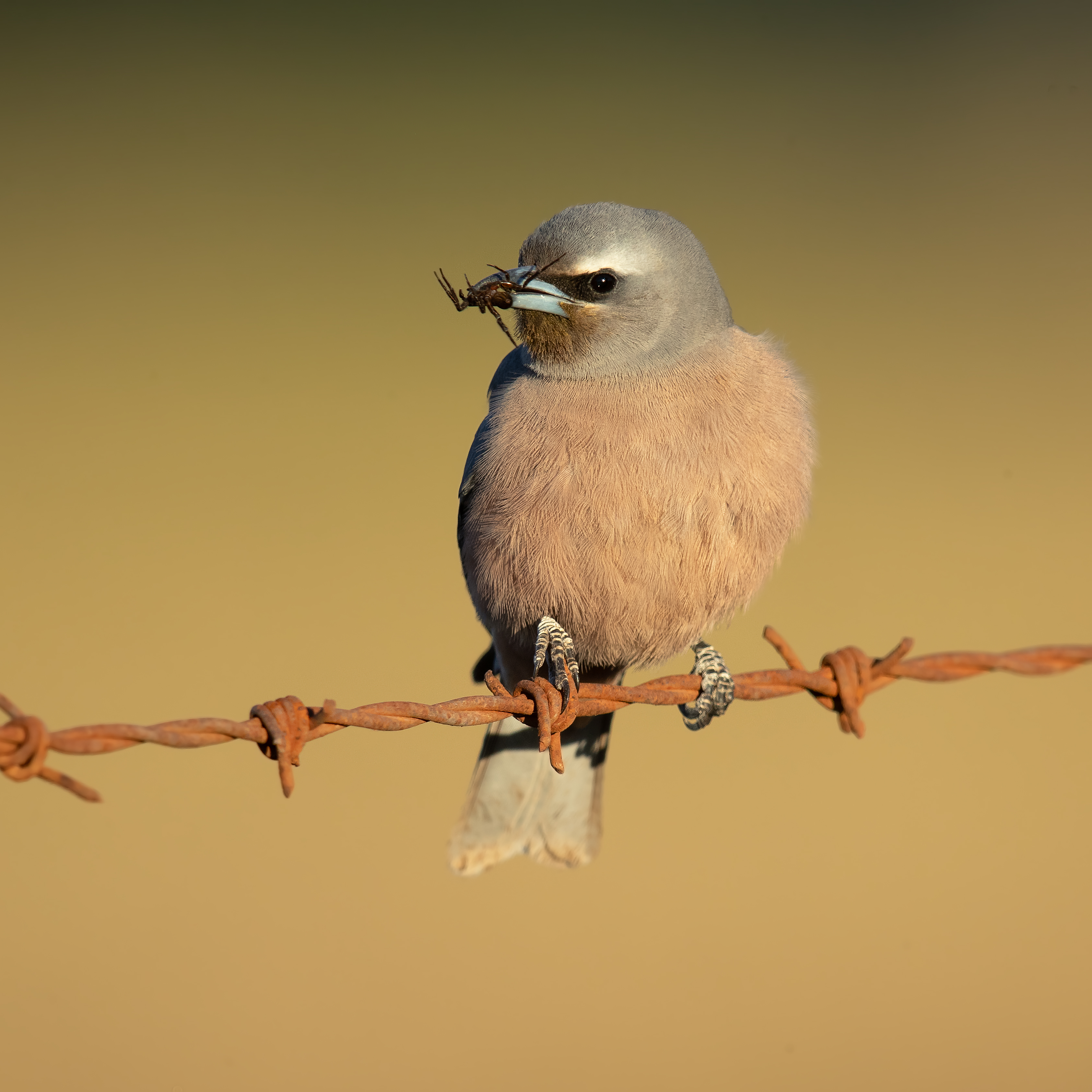
- female with spider

Conservation status
- Least Concern (IUCN 3.1)

Scientific classification
- Kingdom: Animalia
- Phylum: Chordata
- Class: Aves
- Order: Passeriformes
- Family: Artamidae
- Genus: Artamus
- Species: A. superciliosus

Binomial name
- Artamus superciliosus (Gould, 1837)
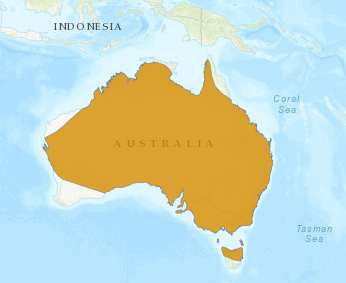

= White-browed woodswallow =

Species of bird

The white-browed woodswallow (Artamus superciliosus) is a medium-sized (~19 cm) passerine bird endemic to Australia. The white-browed woodswallow has very distinctive plumage consisting of white brow over a black head with the upper body being a deep blue-grey and with a chestnut under body. The females are paler then the males. The white-browed woodswallow has a bifurcated (divided) tongue like most woodswallows.

White-browed woodswallows are highly nomadic travelling in pairs to flocks from hundred to thousands of birds. They often wander irregularly around inland Australia, usually heading north for winter in the Northern Territory and central Queensland, and south in spring for nesting. White-browed woodswallows regularly associate with flocks of the masked woodswallow Artamus personatus.

Male, Thargomindah SW Queensland

== Distribution ==
The white-browed wood-swallow is found throughout Australia with higher concentrations in central New South Wales. According to the IUCN Redlist, wood-swallow are considered least of concern.

== Ecology and habitat ==
They inhabit margins of rainforests, woodlands, inland/coastal scrubs, golf courses, vineyards, suburban streets and arid areas of Australia. They make a 'tchip-tchip' call similar to masked woodswallows.

== Reproduction ==
Breeding occurs between August and December or after rain. The species nests in shrubs, forks of trees, hollow stumps or posts, the nest is usually made of twigs, grass and rootlets. The eggs are white/grey, spotted, or blotched brown-grey. A clutch will usually consist of 2 to 3 eggs.

== Diet ==
White-browed woodswallows feed on nectar when blossoms are available but mainly feed on insects.
