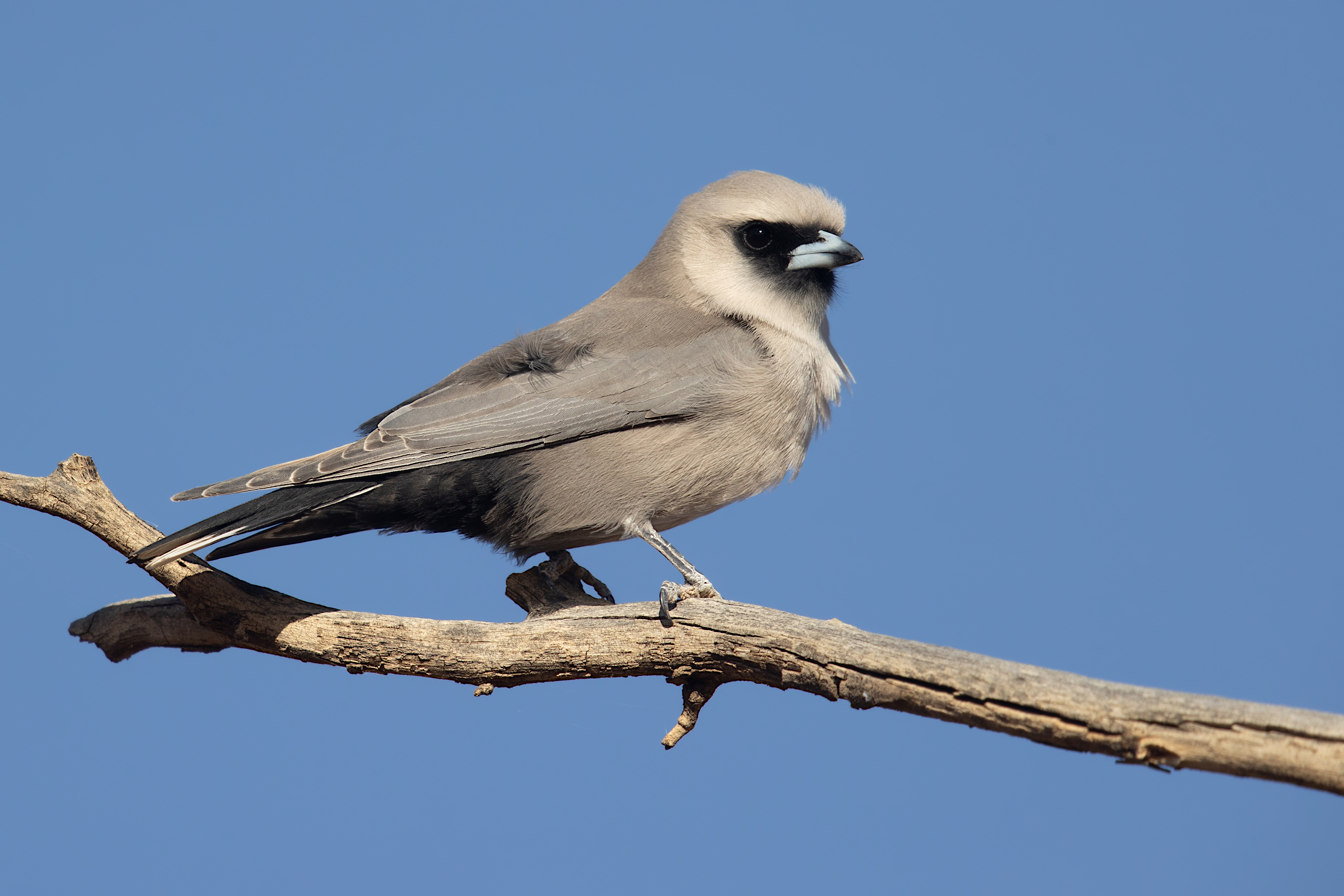

Conservation status
- Least Concern (IUCN 3.1)

Scientific classification
- Kingdom: Animalia
- Phylum: Chordata
- Class: Aves
- Order: Passeriformes
- Family: Artamidae
- Genus: Artamus
- Species: A. cinereus

Binomial name
- Artamus cinereus Vieillot, 1817
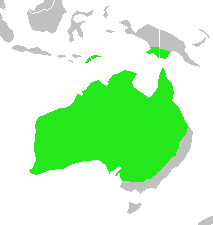
- An image showing the Indonesian archipelago and Australia (Oceania), with green highlighting the distribution of the Black-faced woodswallow.

= Black-faced woodswallow =

Species of bird

The black-faced woodswallow (Artamus cinereus) is a woodswallow of the genus Artamus native to Australia, New Guinea, and the Sunda Islands, including Timor. It is 18–19 cm (7.1–7.5 in) long and is the most widespread species in the family Artamidae. Woodswallows have a soft call with chiff, chap and chattering calls which can include vocal mimicry

Increased vegetation due to inappropriate fire regimes has caused the woodswallows numbers to decline since 1993 in the Cape York Peninsula.

== Taxonomy ==
The black-faced woodswallow was formally described in 1817 by the French ornithologist Louis Pierre Vieillot and given the current binomial name Artamus cinereus. The specific epithet is Latin meaning "ash-grey" or "ash-coloured". Although Vieillot gave the locality as the island of Timor, he had copied the description by the Dutch zoologist Coenraad Jacob Temminck of the "L'angroyan gris" from "la nouvelle Galle meridionale" (New South Wales) that had been published in 1807. Temminck mentioned that the central tail feathers were entirely black which is consistent with Australian race and but not with the race found on Timor where the central tail feathers have white tips. Temminck's specimen is preserved in the Rijksmuseum van Natuurlijke Historie in the Netherlands. In 1982 Gerlof Mees designated this as a lectotype and transferred the name cinereus from the race on Timor to the race found in southwest Australia.

Five subspecies are recognised:

- A. c. perspicillatus Bonaparte, 1850 – Semau, Timor, Leti and Sermata (east Lesser Sunda Islands)
- A. c. normani (Mathews, 1923) – Trans-Fly (central south New Guinea) and Cape York Peninsula, northeast Queensland (northeast Australia)
- A. c. inkermani Keast, 1958 – central east to southeast Queensland (central east Australia)(includes dealbatus Schodde & Mason, 1999, as a synonym.)
- A. c. melanops Gould, 1865 – central, north Western Australia to central north Queensland and north Victoria (west, northwest Australia to inland southeast)
- A. c. cinereus Vieillot, 1817 – southwest Western Australia (southwest Australia)

Within Australia the Great Dividing Range, the Gregory Range and the eastern edge of the Carpentarian grasslands separates the range of the two subspecies. To the east of the range are the subspecies with white vents, while to the west are the black vented subspecies. There have been reported hybrid populations, along territory borders with hybrid zones, where genetic exchange, detected phenotypically using the hybrid index score, has occurred. Of note, the black-vented woodswallows are more adapted to arid and semi-arid conditions, while the white-vented are adapted to tropical conditions. Therefore, selection pressure will probably not result in subspecies merging. The role of possible isolation of an ancestral subpopulation with subsequent expansion after glacial factors during the Pleistocene and environmental factors in generating the different plumage patterns has been considered. Molecular phylogeography using mitochondrial DNA in woodswallows was not helpful in determining biogeographical factors. Mitochondrial DNA studies revealed random intermixing. There are no current studies using nuclear DNA. This confirms that multiple criteria such as plumage, song, and mtDNA, nDNA and interbreeding determine species and subspecies.

== Description ==
SW Queensland, Australia

The black-faced woodswallow is 18–19 cm (7.1–7.5 in) in length, and weighs 32–40 g (1.1–1.4 oz). It has a blue-grey beak with a black tip and a black face mask which extends from the base of the bill up to and around the eyes. It has ash grey plumage, which is lighter around the breast with darker wings, and silver underwings. The tail is black with a white tip.

The subspecies are differentiated by black or white colouration of their tail vents. The white-vented subspecies A. c. normani and A. c. inkermani are found on the Cape York Peninsula and northern Queensland respectively. The black-vented A.c. cinereus occurs in south west Australia, while A. c. melanops occurs in northern Australia and Lesser Sunda Islands, including Timor. The sexes are similar in colouration. Juvenile woodswallows have a brown body and wing coloration with buff streaks and a pale yellow beak. The voice is soft with chiff, chap and chattering animated calls which can include vocal mimicry.

== Distribution and habitat ==
This species is broadly distributed in Australia, occupying most of the continent except for the southeastern margin near its coast. It is mainly sedentary, remaining in arid and semi-arid areas even during dry conditions. Although it can be partly nomadic, the woodswallow prefers open eucalypt woodlands, scrub, and spinifex in arid and semi-arid conditions. In tropical savannah, it prefers open woodlands and grasslands. Woodswallows frequently flock with finches and at times the golden-shouldered parrot.

== Behaviour and ecology ==
=== Food and feeding ===
They are mainly insectivorous. Woodswallows are aerial feeders that can soar, hover and dive to catch insect prey which include moths, and also often feed on the ground taking ground insects, or insects caught on the wing to be dismembered. Woodswallows have brush- like tongues for gleaning nectar and will occasionally feed on flowers.

=== Breeding ===
They are communal breeders, with documented feeding of young by numerous birds, probably as an adaptation to an erratic climate in arid and semi-arid conditions. Woodswallows also exhibit a tendency to flock and cluster roost, during the day and night. Clustering assists with thermoregulation, wind protection, social drive and reduces predation risk.

Breeding generally follows periods of rain with abundant insects, generally, they breed once a year between August and September. The sexes are similar in appearance and courtship displays consist of rotating tails and wing waving. The male and female perch a metre apart, then spread their wings while fanning and rotating the tail.

Nests are built in tree hollows, crevices, forks of branches or on top of stumps. The same areas are occupied each year. Nest building takes 4–7 weeks to complete and is composed of twigs, coarse grass and lined with softer grass.

The eggs are oval in shape and range from 17-22mm in size. The woodswallows eggs come in a clutch size of 3-4 eggs., white to dull white in colouration with blotched markings which are red-brown and lavender speckling. Incubation takes 14–16 days, and chicks fledge 18 days later. The fledglings are at risk from predators such as hawks, butcher birds and kookaburras, but are kept away by alarm calls and attacking behaviour of the parents. Other birds e.g. parrots often feed close to woodswallows thereby reducing their own predation risk. As they are communal breeders, helpers can be seen feeding the young and defending against predators.

== Association with other bird species ==
On the Cape York Peninsula, the black-faced woodswallows associate with golden-shouldered parrots and finches, which has important consequences for the endangered parrots. The woodswallow nesting sites occur closer to more open areas, on gravel slopes and glimmer grass flats. The adults frequently feed on insects on the ground, but are also efficient at defending their territory against predators, which is also beneficial for parrots feeding nearby. However, woodswallows numbers have declined since 1993 in Cape York Peninsula. This loss has been attributed to vegetation thickening as a result of inappropriate fire regimes, which has contributed to increased predation of the golden-shouldered parrot.

== Status ==
Although the current conservation status of black-faced woodswallow is least concern, there have been significant regional declines, particularly on the Cape York Peninsula. These losses are thought to be due to vegetation thickening. However, a recent change in fire management, specifically storm-burning, has resulted in a cessation of woodswallow decline. Storm-burning has produced a more open vegetation structure, which is beneficial for insect feeding and nesting by the woodswallows.
