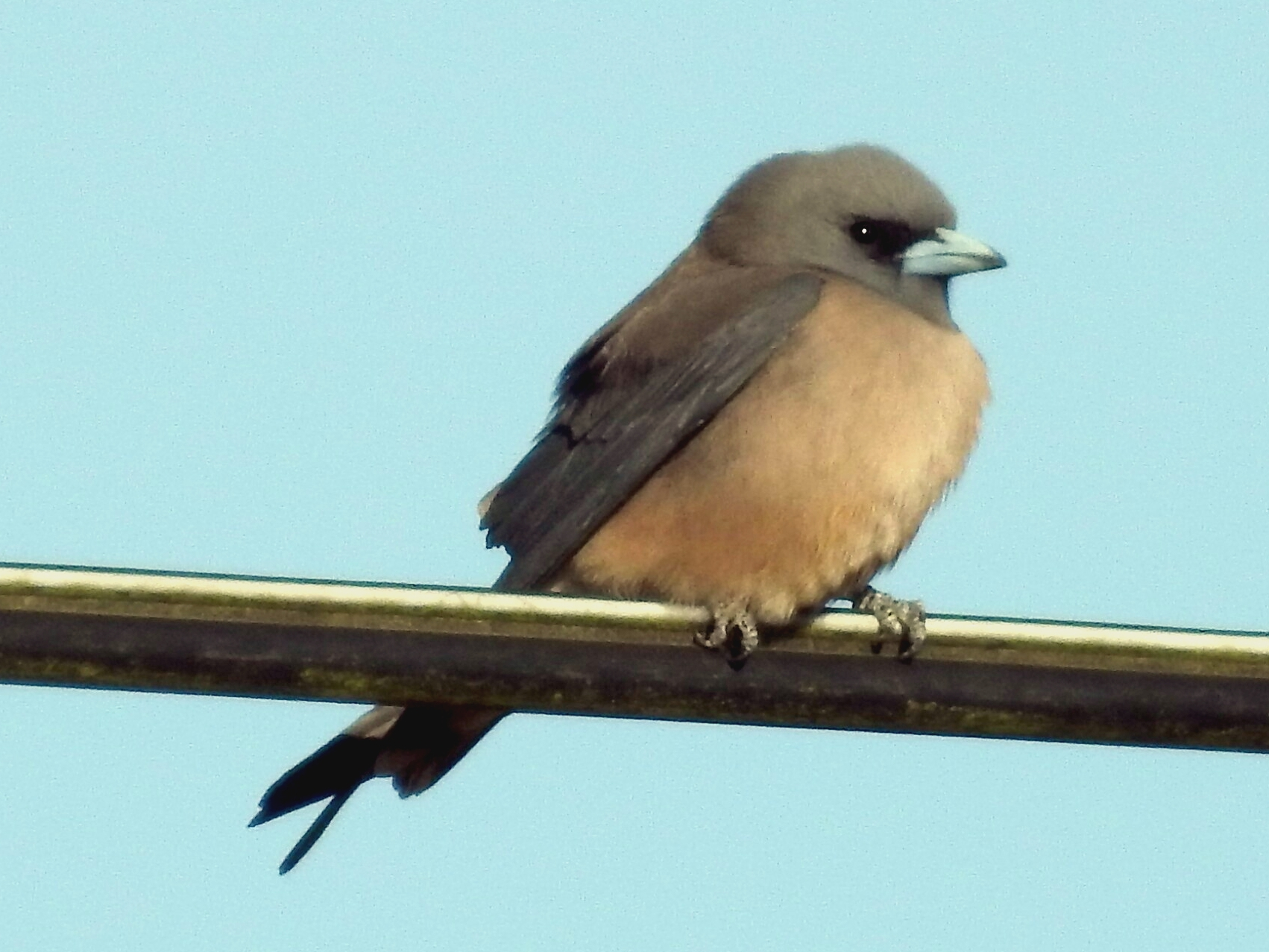
- At Khao Yai, Thailand

Conservation status
- Least Concern (IUCN 3.1)

Scientific classification
- Kingdom: Animalia
- Phylum: Chordata
- Class: Aves
- Order: Passeriformes
- Family: Artamidae
- Genus: Artamus
- Species: A. fuscus

Binomial name
- Artamus fuscus Vieillot, 1817
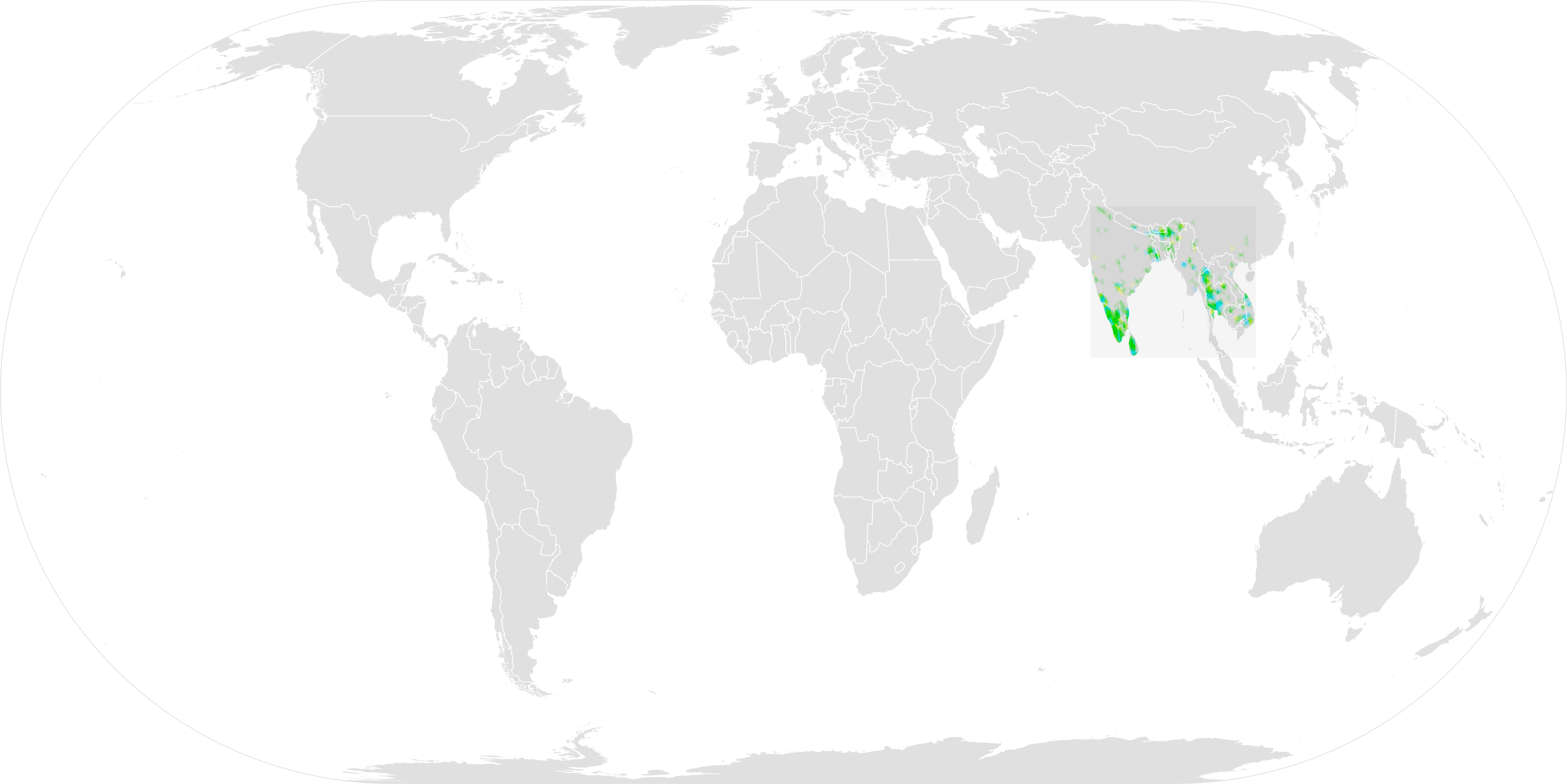
- Global range Year-Round Range Summer Range Winter Range

Audio
- Calls

= Ashy woodswallow =

Species of bird

The ashy woodswallow (Artamus fuscus), sometimes also called the ashy swallow-shrike, is a woodswallow which is found in south Asia. Like other woodswallows, it has a short curved bill, a short square tail and long wings. It is usually seen perched in groups, high on powerlines, tall bare trees and most often in areas with a predominance of tall palm trees.

== Description ==
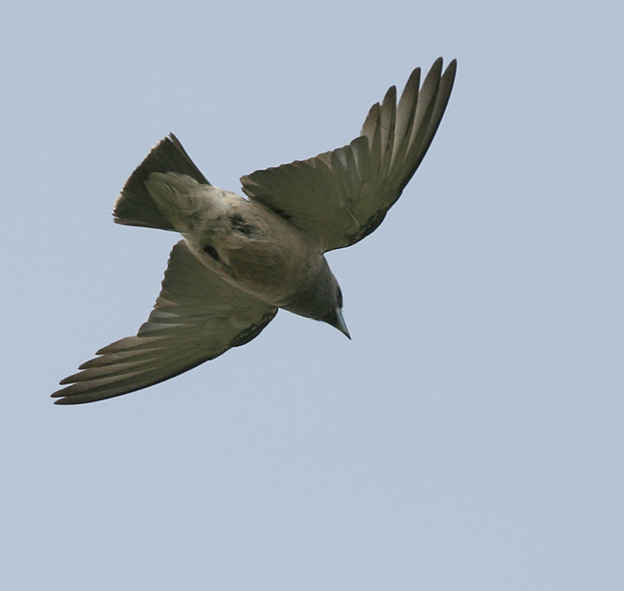
In flight, the broad base to the wings gives it a very triangular outline (Hyderabad, India)

This stocky woodswallow has an ashy grey upperparts with a darker head and a narrow pale band on the rump. The underside is pinkish grey and the short slaty black tail is tipped in white. The finch-like bill is silvery. In flight the long wing looks very broad at the base giving it a very triangular outline. The first primary is very short. The legs are short and the birds usually perch on high vantage points from which they make aerial sallies. There are no geographic variations in plumage and no subspecies have been designated.

Males and females are indistinguishable in the field, however an old report suggests that the sexes differ in the colour of the inside of the mouth. Young birds appear barred on the underside.

== Habitat and distribution ==
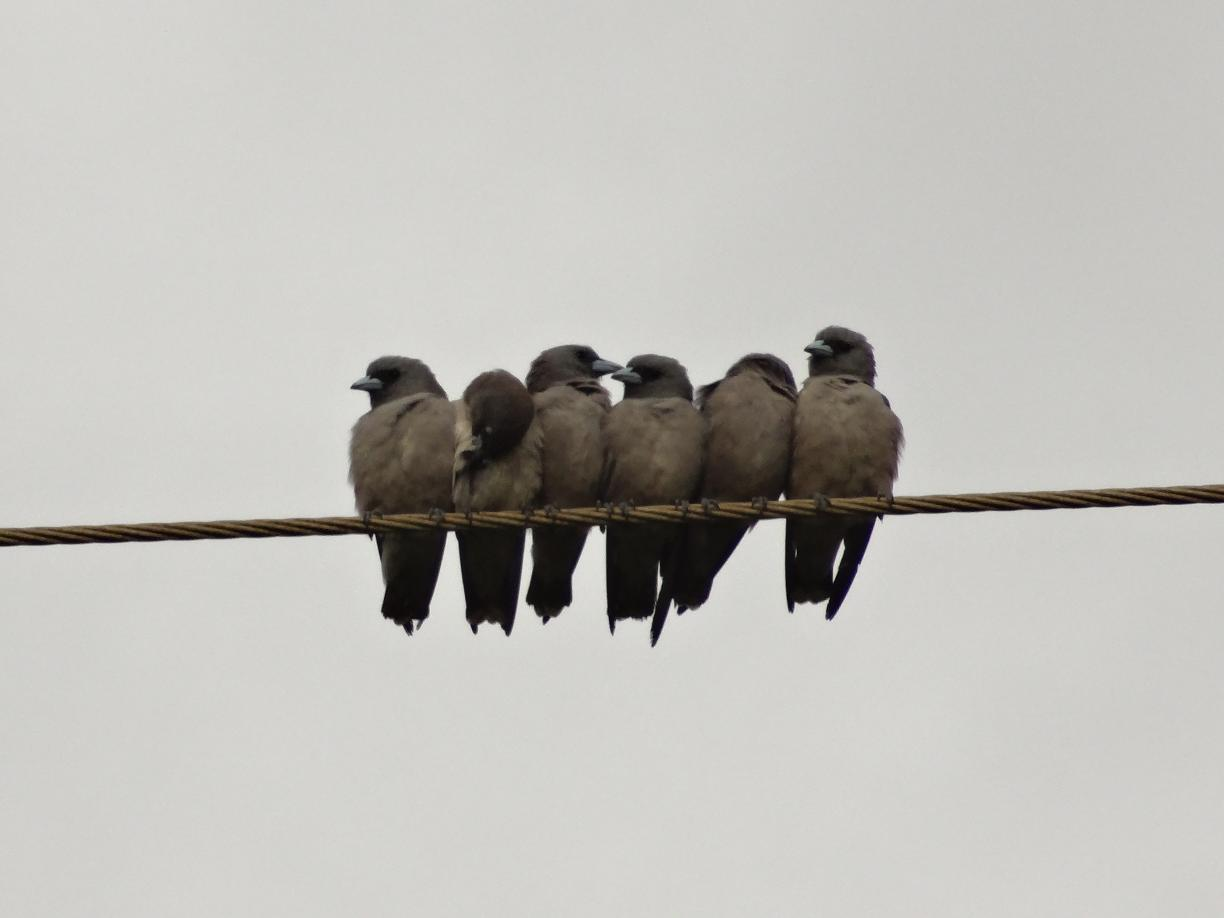
Ashy woodswallows huddling

Woodswallows are found in a range of habitats from the plains to about 2,000 metres (6,600 ft), over cultivated areas, in forest clearings and often in areas with tall palm trees. The species is widely distributed across Bangladesh, India, Nepal, Sri Lanka, Thailand, Myanmar, Laos, Malaysia and China. They are absent in the very arid regions of western India. They have been recorded on the island of Maldives.

== Behaviour and ecology ==
Measurements

Indian specimens
Length		190 mm (7.5 in)
Culmen	♂	21–24 mm (0.8–0.9 in)
	♀	21–23 mm (0.8–0.9 in)
Wing	♂	129–138 mm (5.1–5.4 in)
	♀	130–139 mm (5.1–5.5 in)
Tail	♂	54–60 mm (2.1–2.4 in)
	♀	48–58 mm (1.9–2.3 in)
Tarsus		16–19 mm (0.6–0.7 in)
Weight		37–42 g (1.3–1.5 oz)

Ashy woodswallows are usually seen in small groups. Several birds may sit huddled side-by-side on the bare branches of a tall tree, sometimes preening each other. They also perch on high vantage points such as powerlines and pylons. From their perches, they make aerial sallies, flapping and gliding to capture insects in the air. Insects may be caught in the beak, transferred and held in their feet, torn up with their bill and swallowed without returning to the perch. They may also return to the perch with prey to feed and will sometimes sit on the ground and have been known to visit bird baths. Although mainly feeding on insects, they may take nectar from flowers of trees such as Erythrina. They have been recorded feeding on toxic butterflies of the family Danaiidae such as Euploea core which are avoided by other birds.

The breeding season in India is March to June, the nest is a shallow cup placed at some height such as at the base of the frond of a tall palm or a hollow atop a street lighting post. The usual clutch consists of 2–3 greenish white eggs with brown spots. Both parents take part in nest building, incubation and feeding the young. They will mob larger birds such as crows and birds of prey that approach too close to the nesting birds. The song consists of a varied combination of wheezy notes that may include imitations of the calls of other birds. The usual call is shrill nasal chewk.

They make seasonal movements, possibly in response to rainfall.

The woodswallows, Artamidae, are among the few perching birds that have special feathers called powder down that break up into fine dust that is spread by the birds onto their body when preening. Powder down is also found in the egrets. Members of the family have a brush-tipped tongue. They also have some of the thoracic vertebrae fused into a structure called the notarium.

A species of ectoparasitic birdlouse, Menacanthus elbeli, and a mite that lives inside the feather quill have been described from hosts of this species. Other organisms associated with the species include endoparasitic trematodes Plagiorchis dactylopharynx, Papillatrema echinata and Stomylotrema travassosi.
