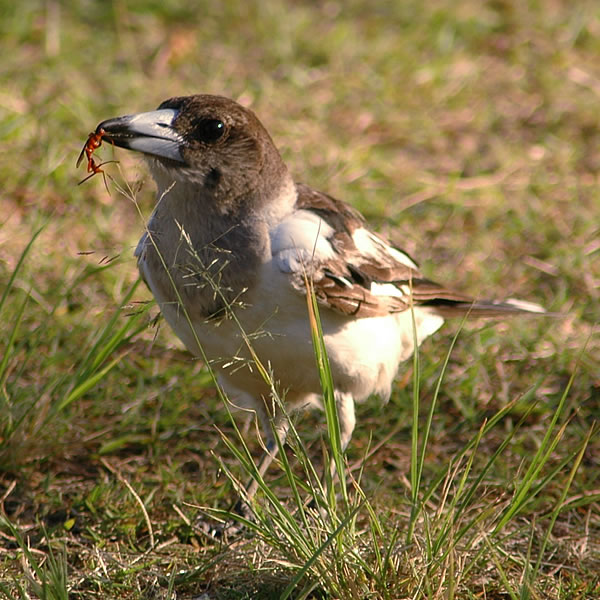
- Pied butcherbird (Cracticus nigrogularis)

Scientific classification
- Kingdom: Animalia
- Phylum: Chordata
- Class: Aves
- Order: Passeriformes
- Superfamily: Malaconotoidea
- Family: Artamidae; Vigors, 1825

Subfamilies
- Artaminae; Cracticinae; Peltopsinae

= Artamidae =

Artamidae Temporal range: Early Miocene–Recent

Family of birds

Artamidae is a family of passerine birds found in Australia, the Indo-Pacific region, and Southern Asia. It includes 24 extant species in six genera and three subfamilies: Peltopsinae (with one genus, Peltops), Artaminae (with one genus containing the woodswallows) and Cracticinae (currawongs and butcherbirds, including the Australian magpie). Artamids used to be monotypic, containing only the woodswallows, but it was expanded to include the family Cracticidae in 1994. Some authors, however, still treat the two as separate families. Some species in this family are known for their beautiful song. Their feeding habits vary from nectar sucking (woodswallows) to predation on small birds (pied currawong).

== Taxonomy and systematics ==
The family Artamidae was introduced by the Irish zoologist Nicholas Aylward Vigors in 1825. The artamids are part of the superfamily Malaconotoidea, a lineage which is widespread through Australasia and consists of a vast diversity of omnivorous and carnivorous songbirds. The family Artamidae has been divided over time into two subfamilies. With few studies and dispute on the inclusion of Cracticidae within the family Artamidae, it appears they have been placed in this respective joint position due to lack of evidence or knowledge. Jerome Fuchs and colleagues extensively analysed both the mitochondrial and nuclear DNA of the artamid family. The results suggested that the group may have existed in Australasia for 33.7 to 45 million years, dating back to the late Eocene.

Kurrartapu is a fossil species known from a proximal tarsometatarsus from the Early Miocene at Riversleigh in central Queensland. It was around the same size as the black butcherbird and had features in common with Strepera and Cracticus.

== Distribution and habitat ==
Artamid species occur throughout Australasia with most species occurring in Australia and New Guinea. The social interactions of artamids vary from the solitary black butcherbird, which lives alone or in a single pair, to the white-breasted woodswallow, which lives in flocks or loose colonies. While some species are sedentary, staying close to suburbia and ample food sources, others are migratory or even nomadic like the masked woodswallow, moving around in response to changes in climate such as rainfall or temperature. The range of habitats occupied varies between species, but many species are ecological generalists, and can be found in a variety of different habitats including rainforest, woodland, coastal scrub, watercourses, playing fields, pastoral land and paperbarks. Some species have adapted to urban landscapes where they contend with fragmented and degraded remnants of native vegetation.

== Morphology ==
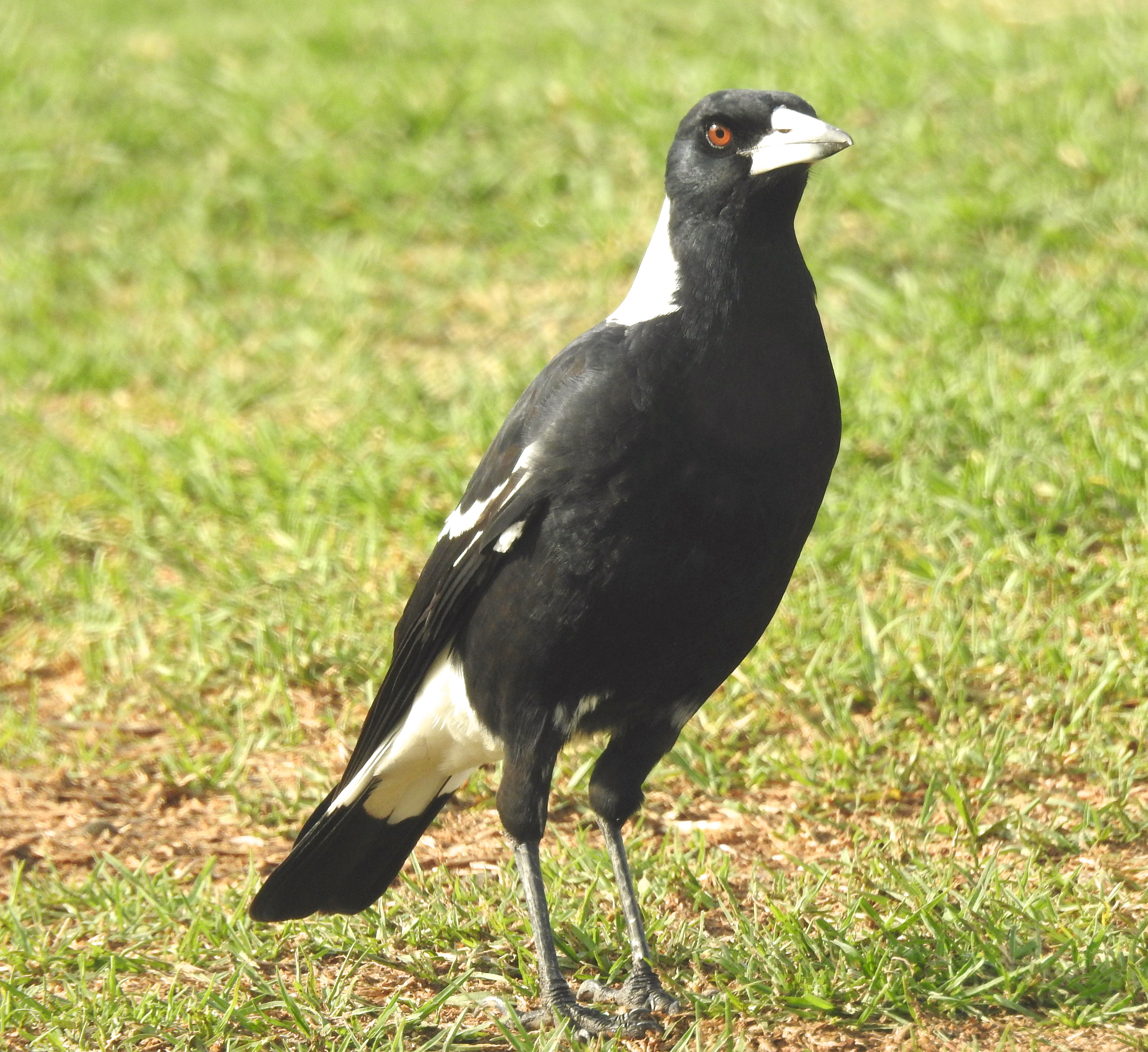
The Australian Magpie showing its plumage.

Artamids are a diverse family showing a notable variation in size and shape. They range in size from the short stocky Fiji woodswallow Artamus mentalis and the ashy woodswallow Artamus fuscus, both of which are around 19 centimetres (7.5 in) in length and weigh about 40 grams (1.4 oz), to the larger grey currawong Strepera versicolour, which measures up to 50 cm (20 in) and weighs up to 440 g (16 oz).

The beaks of artamids are strong and robust, sometimes known as a generalist beak. Like falcons, some of the subfamily Cracticinae possess a sharp projection along the upper mandible, with a corresponding notch on the lower mandible. This hook-like tooth is used to catch and fatally sever the bodies of insects, lizards and small mammals. A trait of artamids (and all passerines) is that they possess an anisodactyl foot arrangement: three toes are directed forward and one toe directed backward, enabling them to perch on horizontal objects such as tree branches and power lines.

Because they possess a syrinx, artamids are able to create subtle songs; those of the pied butcherbird, the pied currawong and the Australian magpie are particularly notable. Uniquely among other perching birds, some woodswallows possess special feathers called powder down. The tips of the barbules on powder down feathers disintegrate, forming fine particles of keratin, which appear as a powder, or "feather dust", among the feathers and spread when preening. The plumage of the artamids is relatively dull, most birds showing a combination of greys, earthy browns, blacks and patches of white. There is seldom sexual dimorphism in plumage, but when it occurs the males are brighter and the females appear dull or resemble juveniles. In many species juveniles have a distinctly duller plumage. The notarium, a fused vertebra of the shoulder in birds that helps brace the chest against the forces generated by the wings, is a distinctive osteological trait that has evolved repeatedly in the passerines including the family Artamidae.

== Behaviour ==
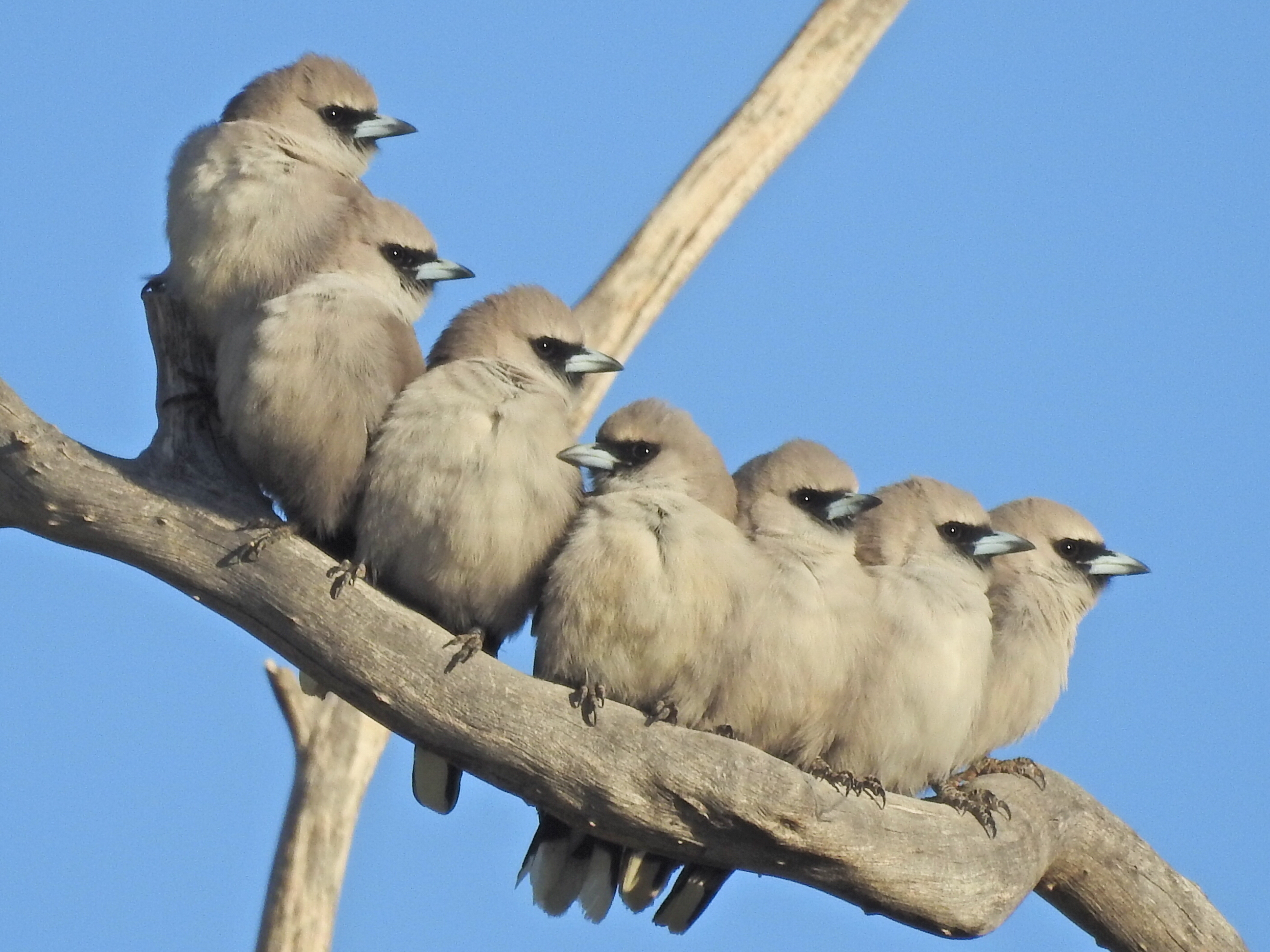
Black-faced woodswallows roosting as a group

Members of the Artamidae, especially the woodswallows, have been known to cluster together during the night and day. Accounts have appeared in literature from the earliest days of ornithological documentation in Australia. The habit of clustering is believed to serve two purposes: retaining body heat during cooler weather and as a social form of camouflage. Another unusual behaviour exhibited by an artamid is the swooping on humans by Australian magpies. While there is not much information on this behaviour, previous studies have suggested that magpie attacks on humans may be strongly influenced by hormone levels. For example, recent investigations indicate that the stress hormone corticosterone may cause magpie aggression and swooping.

== Diet and feeding ==
All are omnivorous to some degree: the butcherbirds mostly eat meat; Australian magpies usually forage through short grass looking for worms and other small creatures; currawongs are true omnivores, taking fruit, grain, meat, insects, eggs and nestlings; and woodswallows feed on insects and nectar. Most are opportunistic feeders, such as the woodswallows, taking advantage of the flowering plants such as the silky oak Grevillea robusta, box mistletoe Amyema miquelii, and the long flowering stalks of Xanthorrhoea spp. or insects such as cockroaches or spiders eaten by the black butcherbird. Bigger species such as the grey currawong prey on many vertebrates, including frogs, lizards such as skinks, and juveniles of smaller birds such as the native eastern spinebill Acanthorhynchus tenuirostris or the introduced house sparrow Passer domesticus. The evolution of vertical feeding zones (feeding strategies subdividing into vertical space, e.g. upper, mid- and ground canopy) is noted among the Artamidae. While species will sometimes overlap vertical terrains, most woodswallows use the upper canopy, feeding on insects and pollen, while magpies and currawongs tend to use the ground or swoop down from the mid-story pouncing on their food. Being accomplished in extractive foraging is another trait of the Artamidae; although they are opportunistic feeders they are very methodical foragers, often following a set routine.

== Threats ==
=== Habitat loss ===
With developments occurring more regularly the most critical threat to the artamids is habitat destruction and habitat fragmentation. This loss of habitat reduces vegetation corridors (connective parcels of vegetation) that are used for feeding, breeding and safely travelling. After fragmentation, habitats are often too small or are limited by the construction of roads. These barriers cause population stresses and species can become vulnerable to localised extinction. Habitat loss and fragmentation can force species into urbanised habitats that impose their own dangers such as cars. Roadkill is considered to contribute significantly to the population decline of many bird species, especially opportunistic feeders like the Artimidae, which often unconsciously swoop down on an insect without seeing an oncoming car.

=== Introduced species ===
In Australia introduced species have caused the greatest number of extinctions. Exotic feral animals such as cats can have a negative effect on artamids. Ground-foraging species such as the magpie often fall prey to cats in urban environments.

== Species ==
There are three subfamilies with six genera and 24 species. In 2013 a molecular study showed the Australian magpie to be the sister taxon to the black butcherbird.

- Subfamily Peltopsinae:
  - Genus Peltops
    - Mountain peltops, Peltops montanus
    - Lowland peltops, Peltops blainvillii
- Subfamily Cracticinae:
  - Genus Melloria
    - Black butcherbird, Melloria quoyi
  - Genus Gymnorhina
    - Australian magpie, Gymnorhina tibicen
  - Genus Cracticus
    - Grey butcherbird, Cracticus torquatus
    - Silver-backed butcherbird, Cracticus argenteus
    - Black-backed butcherbird, Cracticus mentalis
    - Pied butcherbird, Cracticus nigrogularis
    - Hooded butcherbird, Cracticus cassicus
    - Tagula butcherbird, Cracticus louisiadensis
  - †Genus Kurrartapu (Early Miocene)
    - K. johnnguyeni
  - Genus Strepera
    - Pied currawong, Strepera graculina
    - Black currawong, Strepera fuliginosa
    - Grey currawong, Strepera versicolor
- Subfamily Artaminae:
  - Genus Artamus
    - Ashy woodswallow, Artamus fuscus
    - Fiji woodswallow, Artamus mentalis
    - Ivory-backed woodswallow, Artamus monachus
    - Great woodswallow, Artamus maximus
    - White-breasted woodswallow, Artamus leucorynchus
    - White-backed woodswallow, Artamus insignis
    - Masked woodswallow, Artamus personatus
    - White-browed woodswallow, Artamus superciliosus
    - Black-faced woodswallow, Artamus cinereus
    - Dusky woodswallow, Artamus cyanopterus
    - Little woodswallow, Artamus minor
