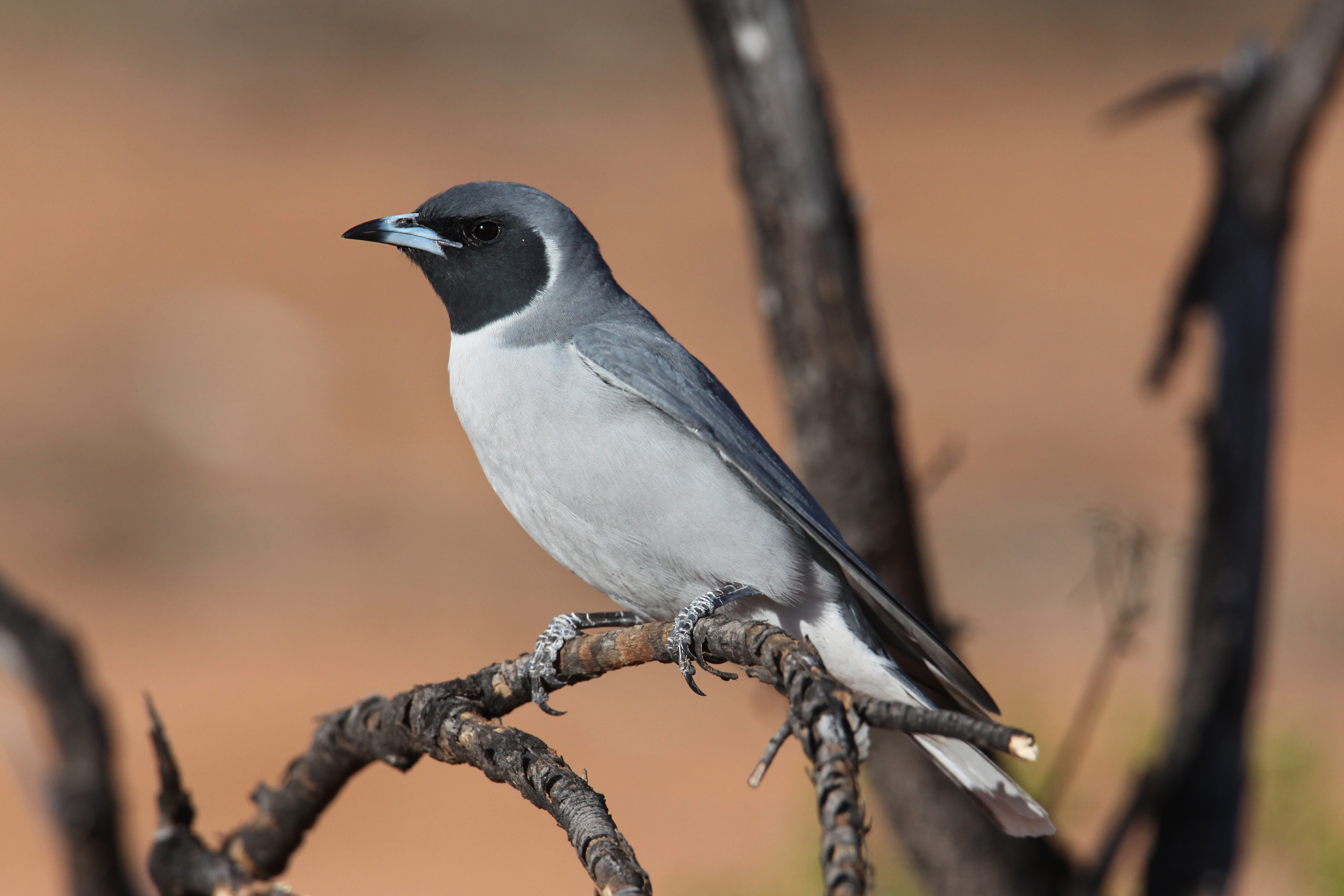

Conservation status
- Least Concern (IUCN 3.1)

Scientific classification
- Kingdom: Animalia
- Phylum: Chordata
- Class: Aves
- Order: Passeriformes
- Family: Artamidae
- Genus: Artamus
- Species: A. personatus

Binomial name
- Artamus personatus (Gould, 1841)

= Masked woodswallow =

Species of bird

Masked woodswallow (Artamus personatus) is a species of bird in the family Artamidae.

== Description ==
A.personatus is a common, gregarious and highly nomadic species, appearing in large flocks usually with white-browed woodswallow (Artamus superciliosus). Among the few passerines that have powder down through their plumage. Listed as least concern on the IUCN Red List.

== Field identification ==
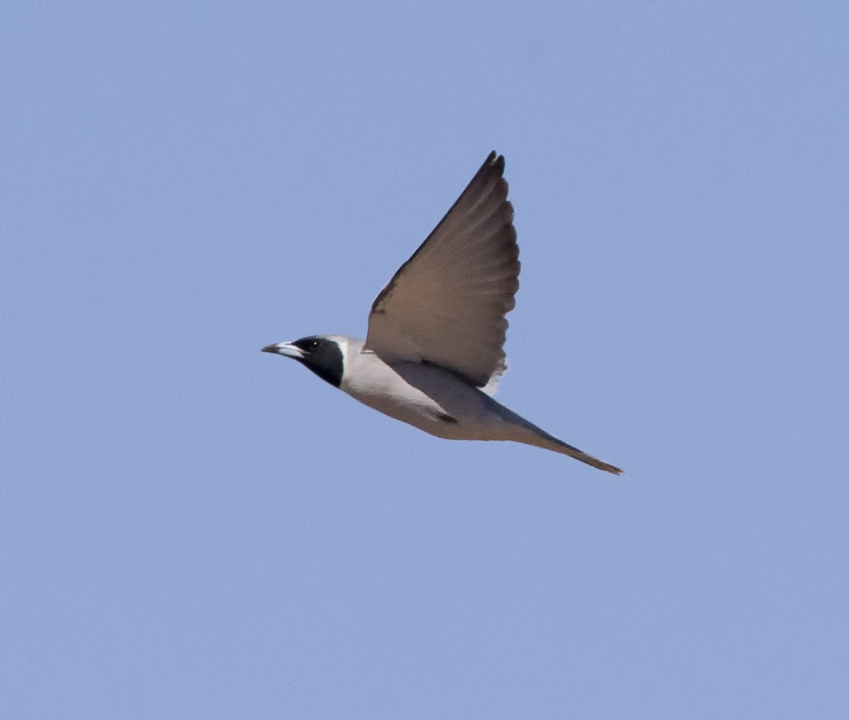

Ranging from 18–20 centimetres (7.1–7.9 in) in length with a wingspan of 32–34 centimetres (13–13 in), weighing approximately 37 grams (1.3 oz), the masked woodswallow is similar in size to the white-browed woodswallow. Sexes differ markedly in colour and also in immature plumage. This difference between sexes is unique only to the masked woodswallow and white-browed woodswallow. Adult males have a sharply defined black face mask with a pale edge. This mask covers the lores, ear coverts, chin and throat. Upperparts are dark blue grey with a prominent white tip on the tail. The underbody is pale grey, fading to greyish white on under tail coverts. Legs and feet are grey to grey black or black. Adult females are similar to adult males but slightly browner and mask is indistinct. Juveniles are similar to adult females but slightly browner with fletched and mottled buff.

== Ecology ==
=== Diet ===
A.personatus is a mainly insectivorous species that has been observed to hawk or pounce on its prey. Nectar also comprises part of its diet and has been observed occasionally eating fruit.

=== Breeding ===
Exclusively pair breeders, consistent with being migratory. A.personatus shows no ecological segregation with A.supercilious but no co operative breeding has been recorded as with other Artamus species. A.personatus breeds throughout most of its distribution range with the exception of eastern and south eastern coastal areas and north of latitude 20°. Usually breeds during spring and summer with annual variation. Breeding frequency is usually once, occasionally twice a year.

=== Nesting ===
Similar to the nest of white-breasted woodswallow (Artamus leucorynchus) but less substantial. Usually only one to two metres (3 ft 3 in to 6 ft 7 in) above the ground, often only a shallow, frail bowl. Has been recorded in stumps, fallen limbs, bush or scrub, fence posts and protruding bark. Nest materials include twigs and grass, with an upper layer of dry or green grass. Both sexes build the nest.

=== Eggs ===
Pale greyish white to pale greenish grey to light creamy brown. Measuring approximately 22 by 17 millimetres (0.87 in × 0.67 in), usual shape, tapered oval. Indistinguishable from the White-browed Woodswallow. 2-3 per clutch, less commonly 1-4.

== Distribution and habitat ==
Widespread on mainland Australia, less common in coastal and near coastal areas, Vagrants have been recorded in Tasmania, New Zealand, Norfolk Island and Lord Howe Island. Mainly inhibit open forest, woodland, heath, roadside and farm tree belts. Mostly occur in arid and semi arid zones.

Carpet Springs, SW Queensland, Australia
