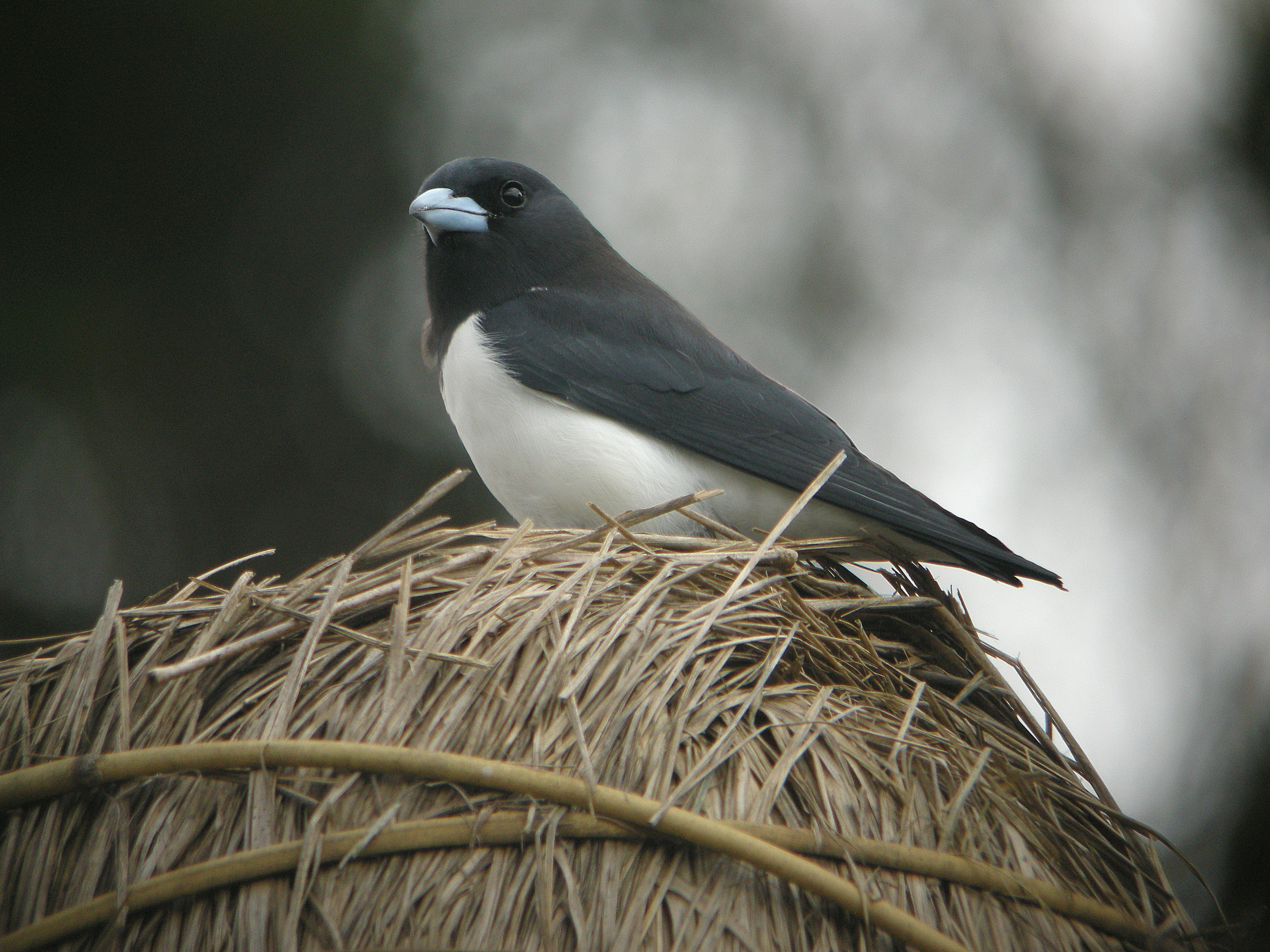

Conservation status
- Least Concern (IUCN 3.1)

Scientific classification
- Kingdom: Animalia
- Phylum: Chordata
- Class: Aves
- Order: Passeriformes
- Family: Artamidae
- Genus: Artamus
- Species: A. maximus

Binomial name
- Artamus maximus Meyer, 1874

= Great woodswallow =

Species of bird

The great woodswallow (Artamus maximus), also known as the greater woodswallow, giant woodswallow or New Guinea woodswallow, is a species of bird in the family Artamidae. As its name implies, it is the largest member of the genus Artamus, averaging 20 centimetres (7.87 in) in length and 61 grams (2.2 oz) in mass. The great woodswallow is very similar in appearance to the more widespread white-breasted woodswallow, but it can be distinguished by its darker black upper side plumage and by the presence of a semi-oval black patch below the throat.

== Distribution and habitat ==
The great woodswallow occurs naturally in tropical moist montane forest, usually amongst clearings with dead trees, most typically dead emergents above the canopy of primary rainforest. Although the species has been known to be common ever since the first Western explorers of New Guinea, it has adapted very well to human manipulation of the landscape and is especially common near Highland towns such as Mount Hagen and Goroka. Great woodswallows are found as high as 3,000 metres (9,800 ft), but are most abundant between 1,000 metres (3,300 ft) and 2,500 metres (8,200 ft). Unlike the Australian dusky woodswallow, great woodswallows do not reduce their body temperature on cool nights.

== Behaviour and breeding ==
Like its smaller relatives, the great woodswallow is a fast-flying aerial insectivore feeding chiefly on large flying insects. It is generally regarded as the smallest bird in the world to habitually soar on updrafts over long distances, but it will also use its feet to manipulate insect prey.

Great woodswallows are highly social, flying in flocks of up to twenty birds, and nomadic over their montane forest habitat. It is common for very close "knots" of the species to allopreen on small posts for up to ten minutes. They usually breed between August and December, and the nest is like that of other woodswallows: a flat platform of grass or twigs in a tree hole or stump, though higher above the ground than other species in the genus. Great woodswallows are cooperative breeders, with most young adults remaining for a number of years with their parents to raise young.

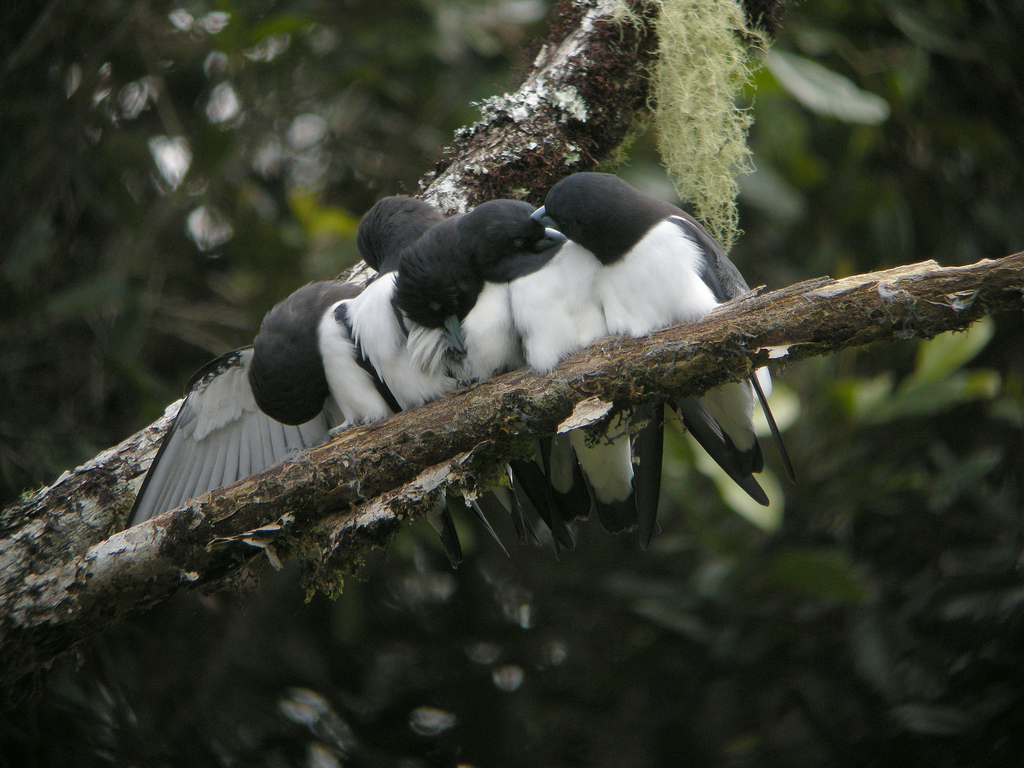
Group preening
