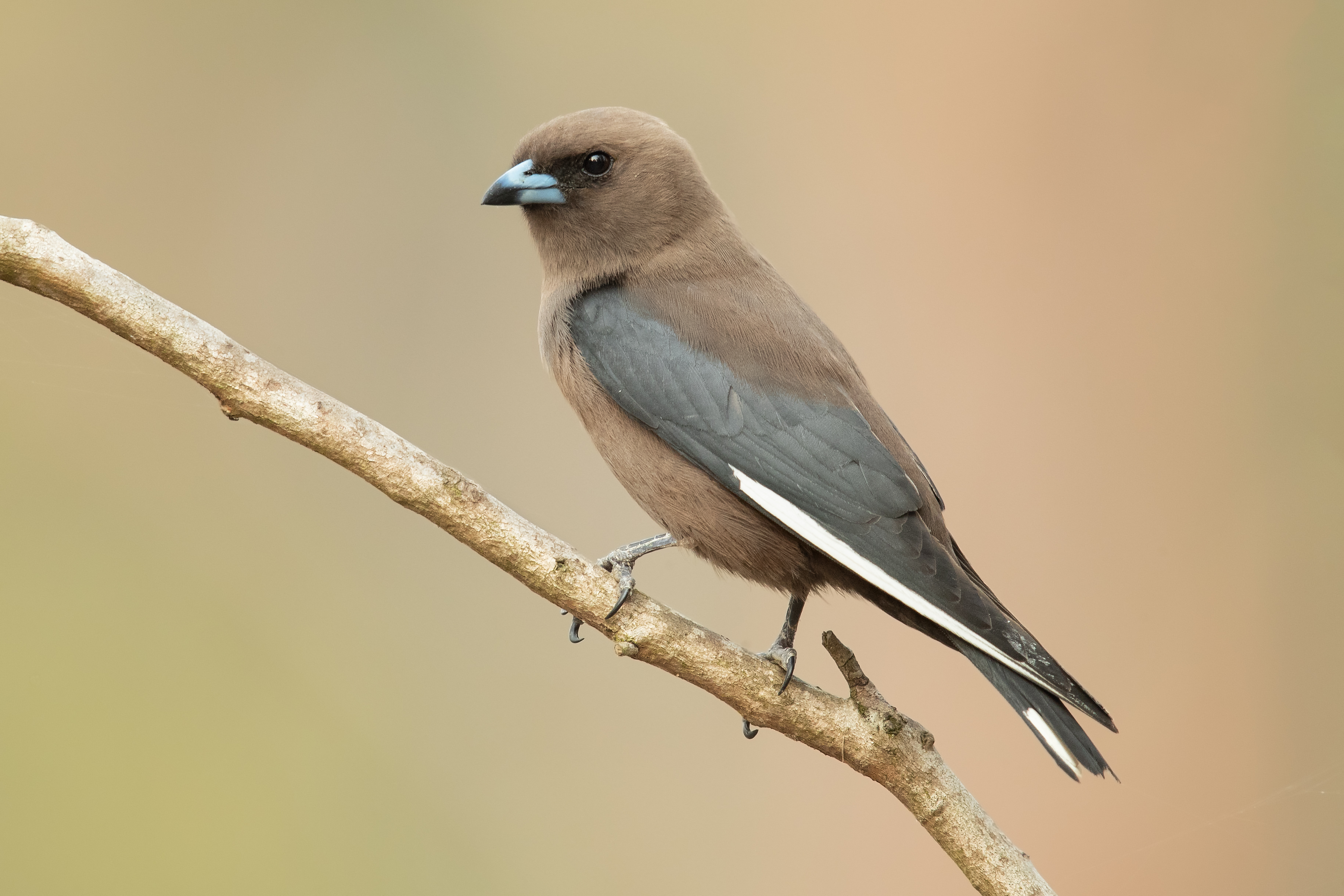

Conservation status
- Least Concern (IUCN 3.1)

Scientific classification
- Kingdom: Animalia
- Phylum: Chordata
- Class: Aves
- Order: Passeriformes
- Family: Artamidae
- Genus: Artamus
- Species: A. cyanopterus

Binomial name
- Artamus cyanopterus (Latham, 1801)

= Dusky woodswallow =

Species of bird

The dusky woodswallow (Artamus cyanopterus) is a bird species of forests and woodlands in temperate and subtropical regions, extending into tropical areas around the Atherton Tableland, in eastern and southern Australia. The global population of the species has as yet not been formally confirmed, but it has been officially rated in the range of 'Least Concern', according to the BirdLife International in 2004. As such, the bird could be described as common in its local habitat.

The name "woodswallow" is a misnomer as they are not closely related to true swallows. Instead, they belong to the family Artamidae, which also includes butcherbirds, currawongs and the Australian magpie.

== Taxonomy ==
The dusky woodswallow was first described by the English ornithologist John Latham in 1801 with the binomial name Loxia cyanoptera. Its specific epithet is derived from the Ancient Greek words cyanos 'blue' and pteron 'wing'.

== Description ==
The dusky woodswallow is medium-sized and swallow-like, with a dark brown hue, but there have been instances where the bird has appeared grey. The birds have a black patch in front of the eyes, and grey (sometimes also black) wings with white streaks on them. The dusky woodswallow has a black, white-tipped tail with a silver underwing. The birds have a blue-grey bill capped with black. Dusky woodswallows are known to spontaneously 'wag' or swivel their tails fervently, a trait which is common among many other species of woodswallow.

=== Relations to other woodswallows ===
In a significant difference from other woodswallows, dusky woodswallows have a distinctive white patch on the outer wing. Dusky woodswallows also seem to typically be more smoky brown than other species of woodswallow. The little woodswallow, a smaller, darker woodswallow is also slightly more smoky brown that other woodswallows, but that is the only similarity that the latter has with the dusky woodswallow; the little woodswallow does not share a white patch on the outer wing.

== Distribution and habitat ==
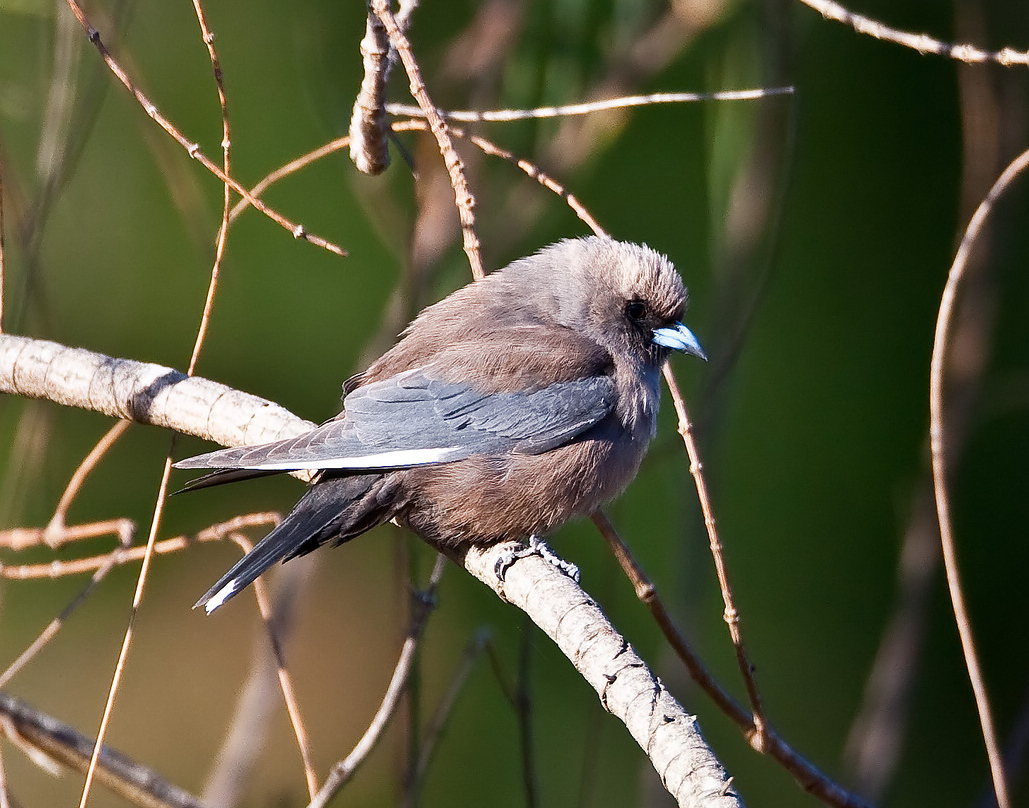
In Tasmania

The birds live primarily in open eucalyptus forests and woodlands. They range mostly from Atherton Tableland, Queensland, down to Tasmania and west to Eyre Peninsula, in South Australia. They roost communally, usually nocturnally. During the breeding season, they nest in large flocks to make sure to keep predators away from young. These flocks can be 20–30 dusky woodswallows in size.

Dusky woodswallows adhere to seasonal migration and movements. The birds are a nomadic species, and tend to move quite spontaneously. However, one certain change of habitat occurs for the south-eastern birds, who migrate northward for Autumn.

Communally roosting birds, the dusky woodswallow has a variety of chattering calls which are used in certain situations. The most distinctive of these calls is perhaps the one which is used when a predator or intruder approaches, which consists of a harsh mobbing call to warn others.

== Behaviour ==
=== Feeding and diet ===
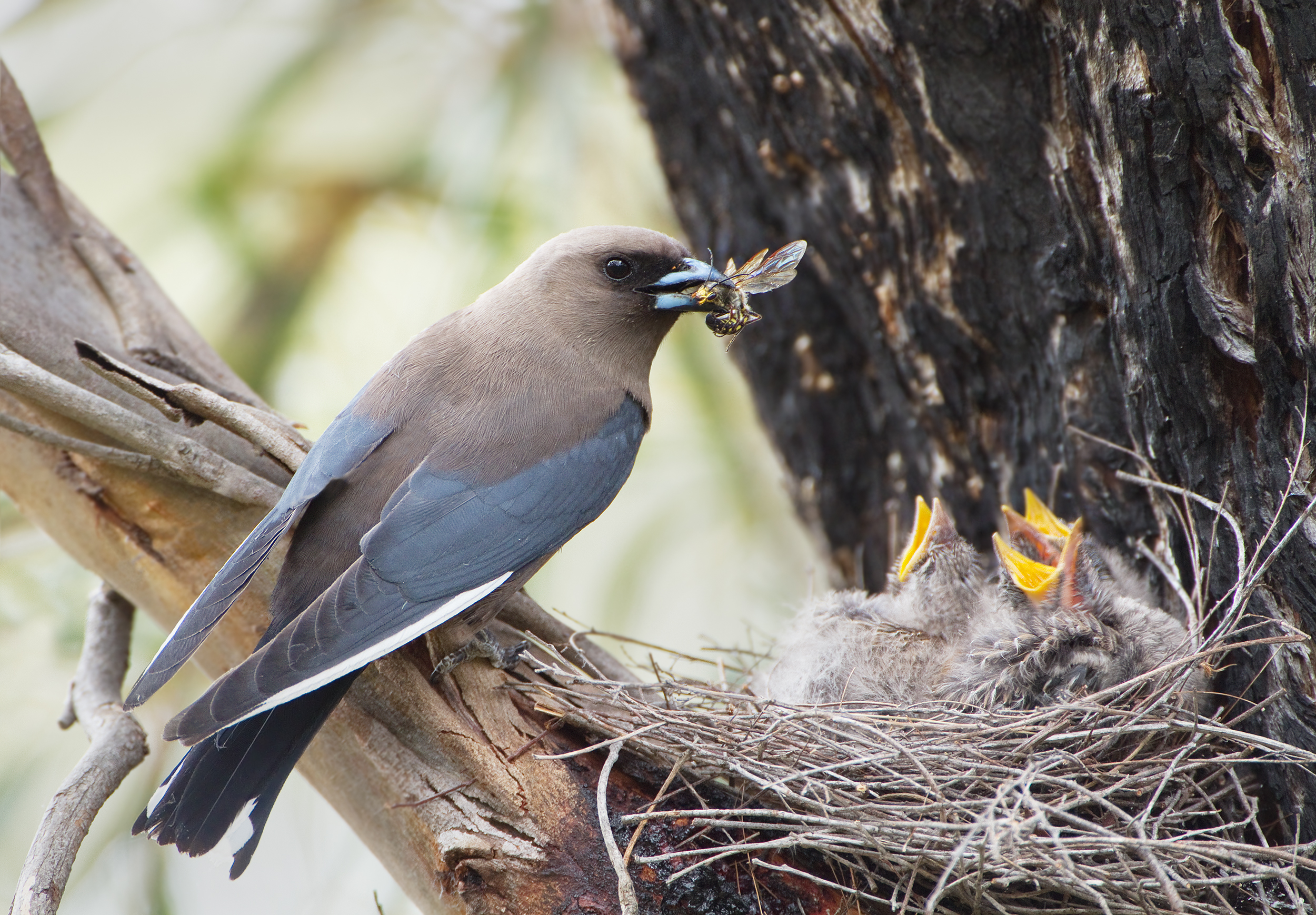
Parent feeding chicks a wasp

The diet of the bird can be varied. They eat various forms of foliage and other grassy material that they find on the ground on in trees and shrubs. Dusky woodswallows have been seen eating termites, butterflies and other insects. They also eat nectar from flowers. One notable aspect of their feeding habits is the way they hunt flying insects, which is done by picking them up on their wing. They do, however, also eat their prey from the ground, and they often find inconspicuous places to perch while waiting for prey, such as utility lines and the like. They have also been observed engaging in kleptoparasitism, working as a group to rob a restless flycatcher of its prey.

=== Breeding ===
The nest of the dusky woodswallow consists of twigs, roots and other similar foliage matted together to form a bowl shape, which is lined with grass. It is positioned safely, behind bark, and/or high in a tree branch, and sometimes in a hollowed out tree stump. The nest is made during the period from August to January, and with the help of several birds. The mated pair will then guard the nest, while others will help them take care of the babies. The female lays white eggs, of which there are usually no more than three or four. While the incubation period lasts for sixteen days, the amount of time taken for fledgling can be this long to around twenty days. The typical clutch is three to four in size, but this may vary.

== Conservation status ==
The dusky woodswallow has a very large range. The population size of this bird has not yet been quantified or estimated. It is, however, expected to be as populous as other birds within its densest range labeled 'common'. Because of this, the dusky woodswallow is listed as a species of least concern by the International Union for Conservation of Nature (IUCN) on the IUCN Red List.

== See also ==
- List of Australian birds
