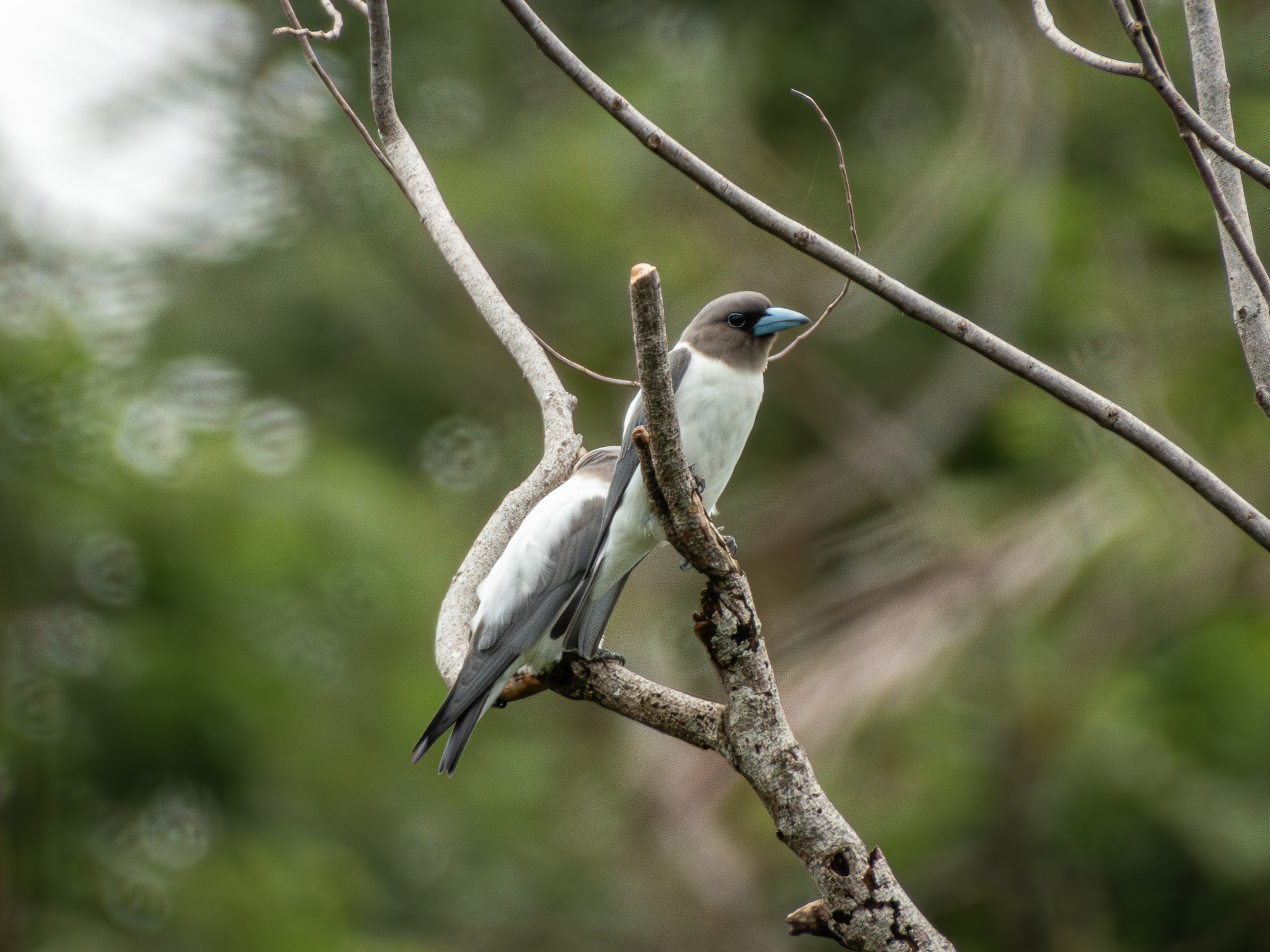

Conservation status
- Least Concern (IUCN 3.1)

Scientific classification
- Kingdom: Animalia
- Phylum: Chordata
- Class: Aves
- Order: Passeriformes
- Family: Artamidae
- Genus: Artamus
- Species: A. monachus

Binomial name
- Artamus monachus Bonaparte, 1850

= Ivory-backed woodswallow =

Species of bird

The ivory-backed woodswallow (Artamus monachus) is a species of bird in the family Artamidae. It is endemic to Sulawesi, Indonesia. Its natural habitats are subtropical or tropical moist lowland forests and subtropical or tropical moist montane forests.
