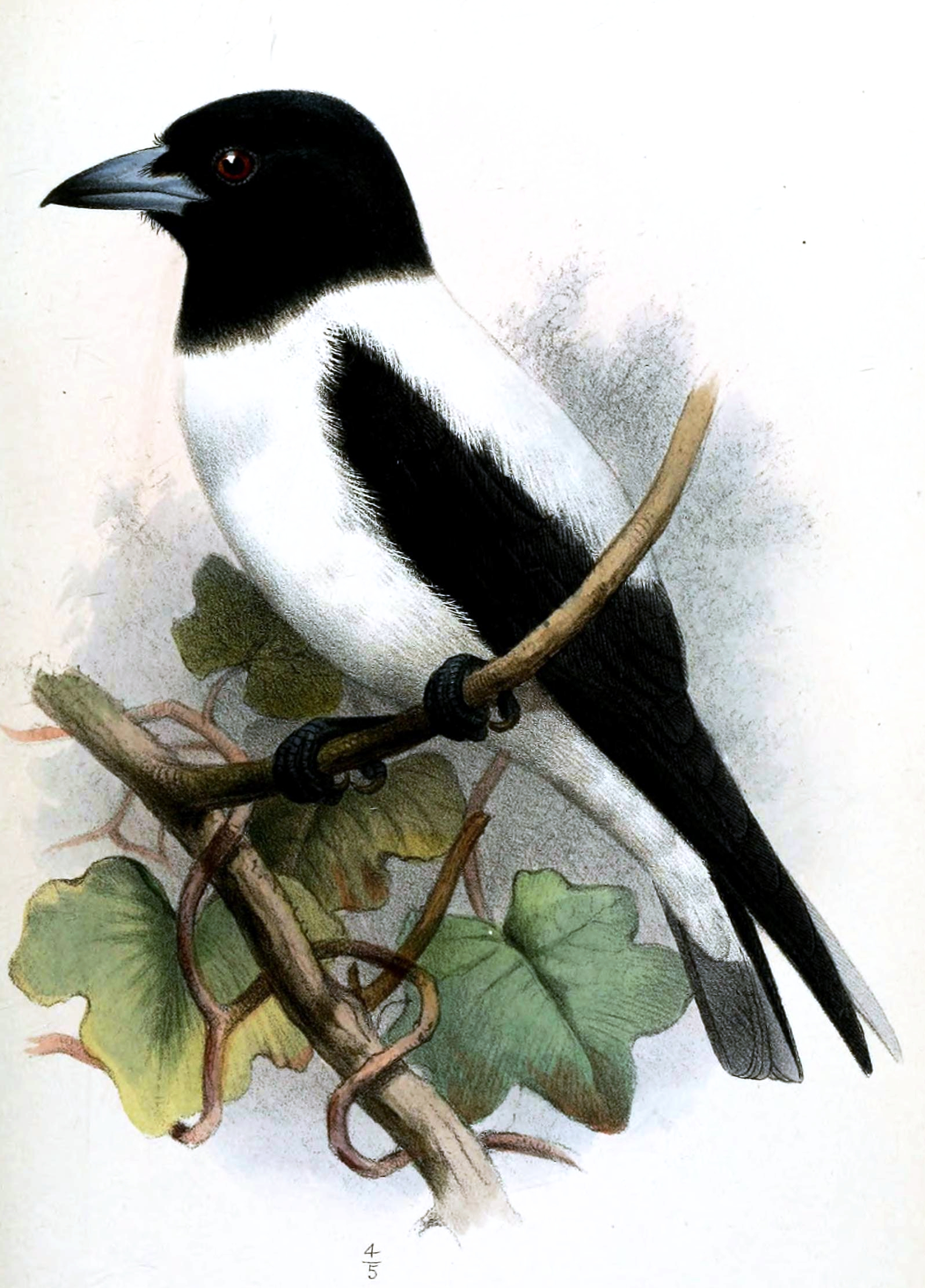

Conservation status
- Least Concern (IUCN 3.1)

Scientific classification
- Kingdom: Animalia
- Phylum: Chordata
- Class: Aves
- Order: Passeriformes
- Family: Artamidae
- Genus: Artamus
- Species: A. insignis

Binomial name
- Artamus insignis Sclater, PL, 1877

= White-backed woodswallow =

Species of bird

The white-backed woodswallow (Artamus insignis) or Bismarck woodswallow, is a species of bird in the family Artamidae. It is endemic as its name suggests, to the Bismarck Archipelago (Papua New Guinea).

Its natural habitat is subtropical or tropical moist lowland forests.
