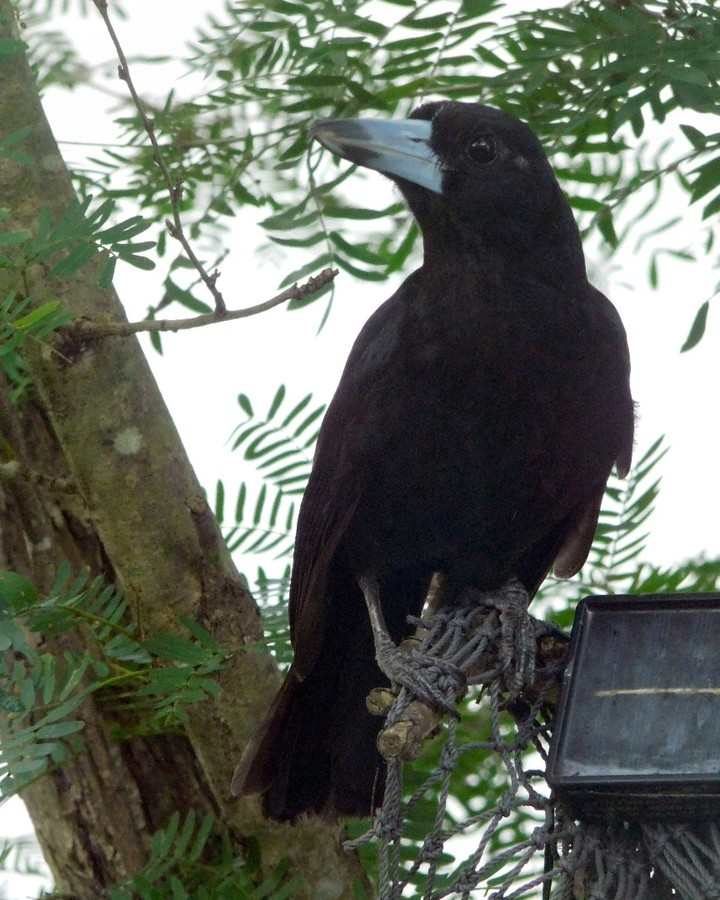

Conservation status
- Least Concern (IUCN 3.1)

Scientific classification
- Kingdom: Animalia
- Phylum: Chordata
- Class: Aves
- Order: Passeriformes
- Family: Artamidae
- Subfamily: Cracticinae
- Genus: Melloria; Mathews, 1912
- Species: M. quoyi

Binomial name
- Melloria quoyi (Lesson & Garnot, 1827)

Synonyms
- Cracticus quoyi

= Black butcherbird =

Species of bird

The black butcherbird (Melloria quoyi) is a species of butcherbird in the family Artamidae. It is found in Australia, Indonesia, and Papua New Guinea. Its natural habitats are subtropical or tropical dry forest, subtropical or tropical moist lowland forest, and subtropical or tropical mangrove forest.

== Taxonomy ==
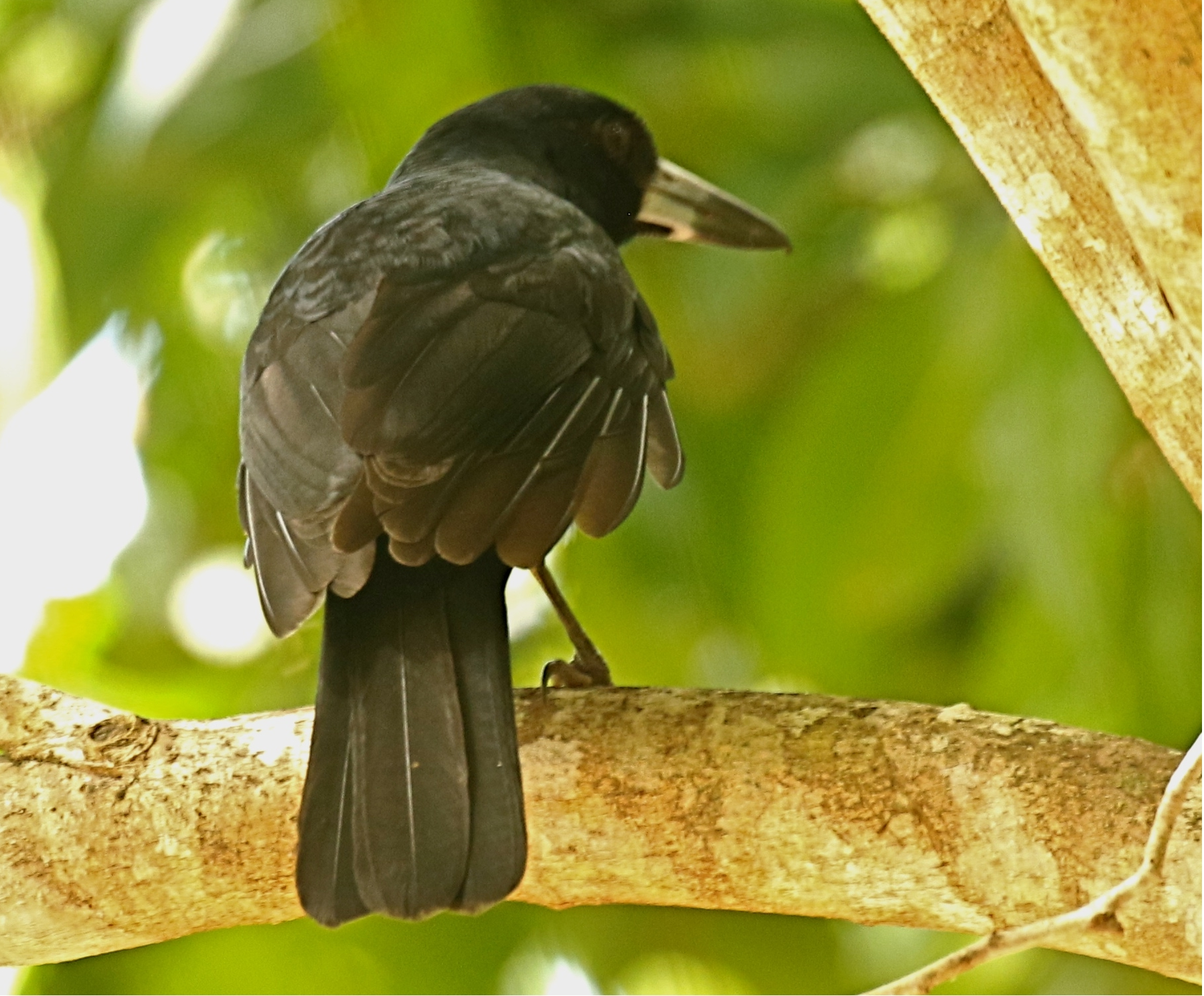
Cairns Centenary Lakes - Australia

Evidence was published in a 2013 molecular study which showed that it is closest relative to the Australian magpie (Gymnorhina tibicen). The ancestor to the two species is thought to have split from the other butcherbirds between 8.3 and 4.2 million years ago, during the late Miocene to early Pliocene, while the two species themselves diverged sometime during the Pliocene (5.8–3.0 million years ago).

== Description ==
The adult is black all over except for its beak which is black-tipped grey. Most juveniles are rufous-brown. Confusingly, some juveniles are black while some brown young birds may rarely retain their brown colour into adulthood. As the only butcherbirds with wholly black bodies, they are sometimes confused with crows or currawongs, from which they are distinguished by their gray and hooked bills.

== Behaviour ==
In Papua New Guinea, Black butcherbirds have been observed parasitising the nests of Hooded monarch birds.

In 1903, ornithologist E. M. Cornwall observed brown and black varieties of the bird, the black preferring deeper forest and the brown preferring coastal scrub or mangroves.
