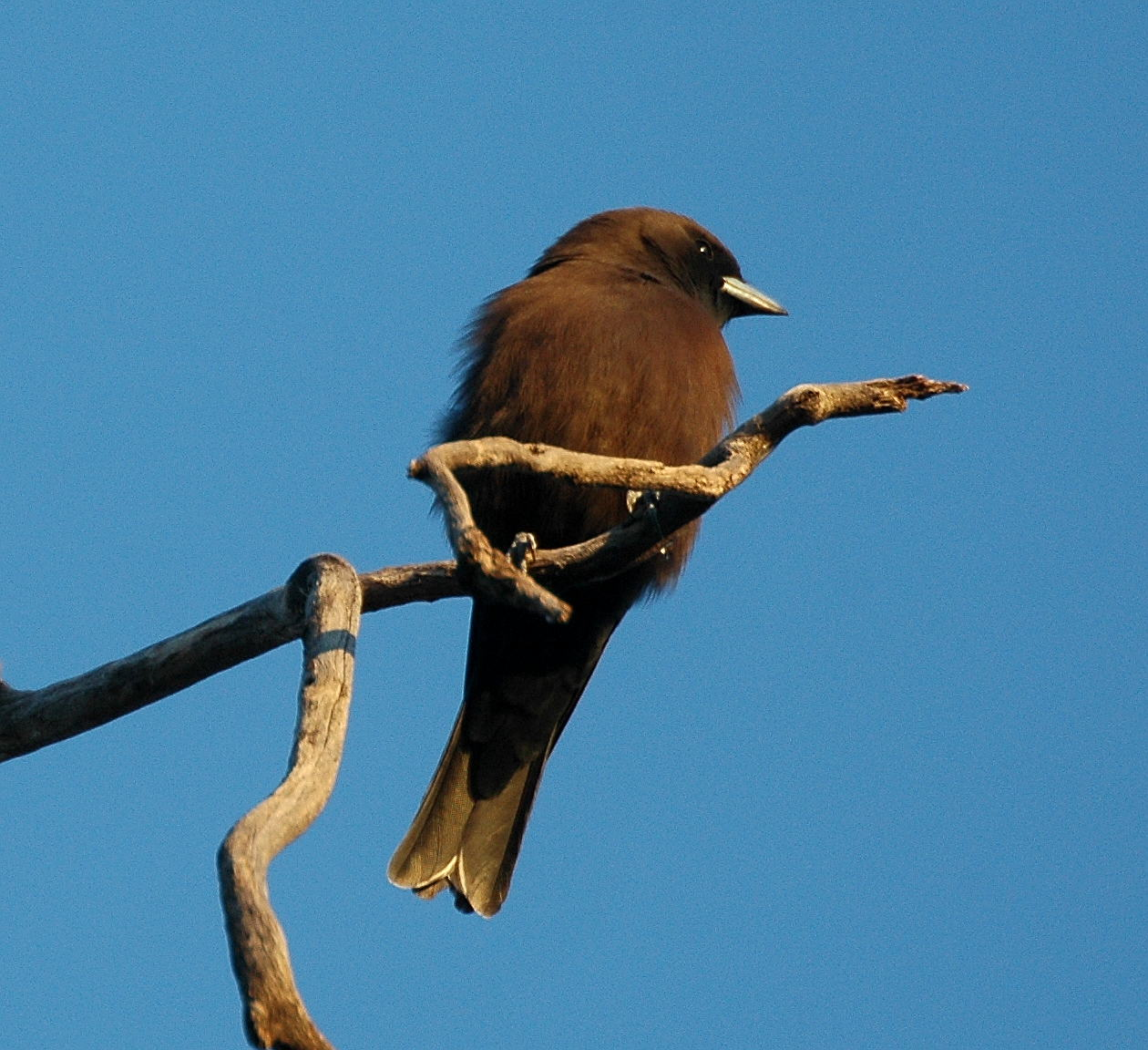

Conservation status
- Least Concern (IUCN 3.1)

Scientific classification
- Kingdom: Animalia
- Phylum: Chordata
- Class: Aves
- Order: Passeriformes
- Family: Artamidae
- Genus: Artamus
- Species: A. minor

Binomial name
- Artamus minor Vieillot, 1817

= Little woodswallow =

Species of bird

The little woodswallow (Artamus minor), is a bird patchily distributed over much of mainland Australia, avoiding only the driest deserts and the area within about 300 kilometres of the southern coastline, and showing a preference for rugged terrain around inland ranges.

As its name suggests, at 12 to 14 cm in length it is the smallest of the woodswallows. It is dark, smoky brown overall, with deep gunmetal grey wings and a black-tipped, blue-tinged bill.

Like other woodswallows, groups cluster huddled close together on high, dead branches to rest or sleep. Typical group sizes are modest but it is not uncommon to have hundreds gather together at a roost site.

Little woodswallows soar effortlessly above the treetops or along cliff faces when hunting flying insects—being small, they are easily confused with martins.

The nest is a rudimentary affair, placed in a tree hollow or similar space, and made of twigs and other vegetable matter. Breeding takes place from August to January, or after rain. Three eggs are laid and the young leave the nest when barely able to fly, taking up a perch on a nearby tree and calling incessantly for the food the parents bring them.

Adavale, SW Queensland, Australia
