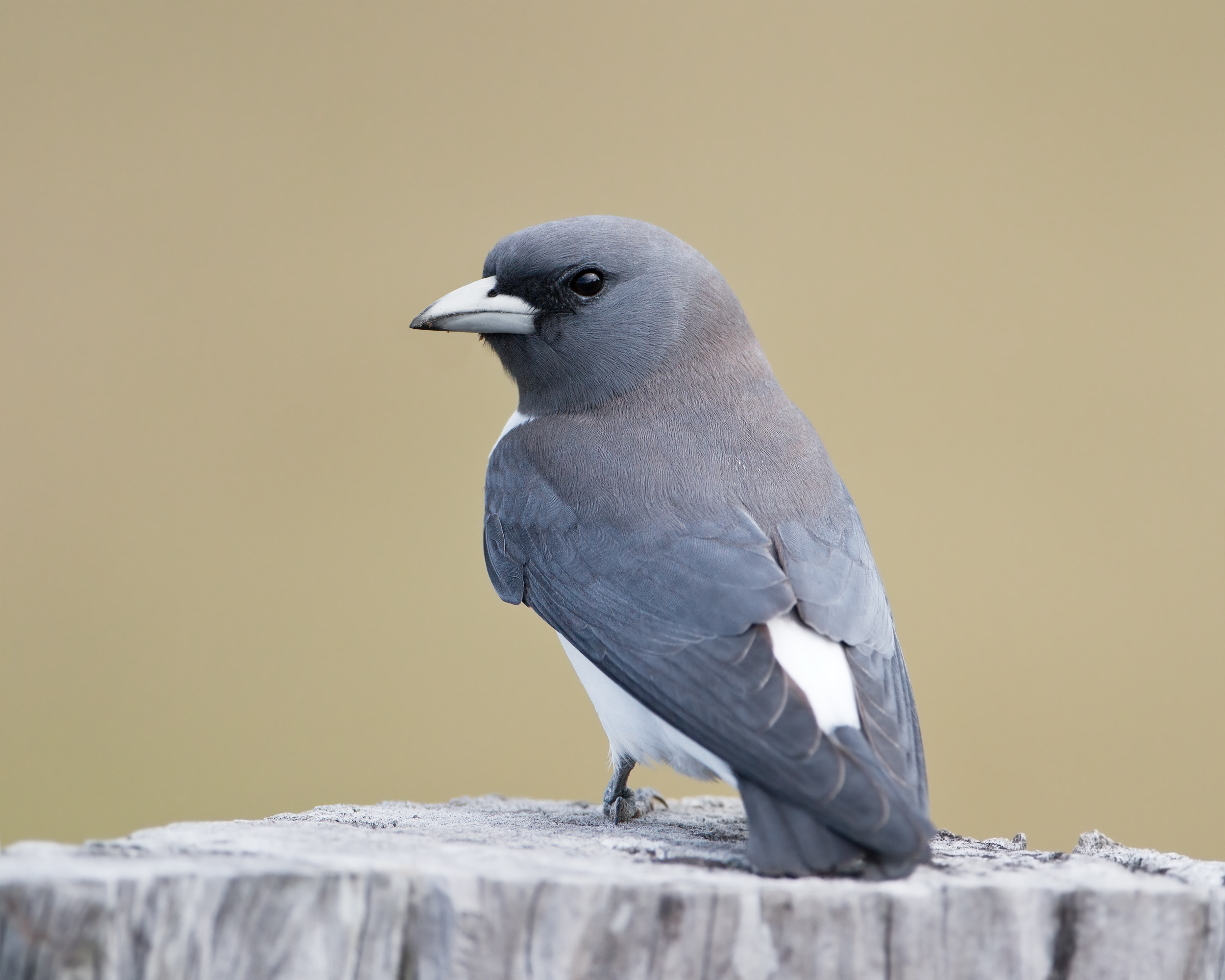

Conservation status
- Least Concern (IUCN 3.1)

Scientific classification
- Kingdom: Animalia
- Phylum: Chordata
- Class: Aves
- Order: Passeriformes
- Family: Artamidae
- Genus: Artamus
- Species: A. leucorynchus

Binomial name
- Artamus leucorynchus (Linnaeus, 1771)

= White-breasted woodswallow =

Species of bird

The white-breasted woodswallow (Artamus leucorynchus) is a medium-sized passerine bird which breeds from the Andaman Islands east through Indonesia and northern Australia. The name "woodswallow" is a misnomer as they are not closely related to true swallows. Instead, they belong to the family Artamidae, which also includes butcherbirds, currawongs and the Australian magpie.

== Taxonomy ==
The white-breasted woodswallow was formally described in 1771 by the Swedish naturalist Carl Linnaeus. He placed it with the shrikes in the genus Lanius and coined the binomial name Lanius leucoryn[chus]. His account was based on "la pie-griesche de Manille" that had been described and illustrated in 1760 by the French zoologist Mathurin Jacques Brisson. Brisson had examined a specimen collected in Manila on the island of Luzon in the Philippines. The specific epithet is derived from the Ancient Greek words leukos meaning "white", and rhynchos meaning "bill". The white-breasted woodswallow is now one of 11 species placed in the genus Artamus that was introduced in 1816 by Louis Pierre Vieillot.

Nine subspecies are recognised:

- A. l. pelewensis Finsch, 1876 – Palau (west Caroline Islands, west Micronesia)
- A. l. leucorynchus (Linnaeus, 1771) – Philippines to Natuna Islands (northwest of Borneo), Borneo and islands off north coast and Maratua (east of northeast Borneo)
- A. l. amydrus Oberholser, 1917 – west Malay Peninsula, Sumatra, Bangka (east of south Sumatra), Java, Masalembu (north of east Java), Bali and Kangean Islands (north of Bali)
- A. l. humei Stresemann, 1913 – Andaman Islands and Coco Islands (north of Andaman Islands)
- A. l. albiventer (Lesson, RP, 1831) – Sulawesi and satellites, including Banggai Island (east of Sulawesi) and Lombok to Timor and Wetar (Lesser Sunda Islands)
- A. l. musschenbroeki Meyer, AB, 1884 – Babar Islands (far east Lesser Sunda Islands) and Tanimbar Islands (south Moluccas)
- A. l. leucopygialis Gould, 1842 – Moluccas, New Guinea and satellites, and north, east Australia
- A. l. melaleucus (Wagler, 1827) – Grande Terre, Ile des Pins, and Lifou and Mare (central, east Loyalty Islands; New Caledonia)
- A. l. tenuis Mayr, 1943 – Vanuatu including Banks Islands

== Description ==
The white-breasted woodswallow's plumage is dark grey on the head and neck, with white underparts, giving the species its common and scientific names, in contrast to the related great woodswallow whose upper side is a more glossy black. The stout bill is bluish-grey with a black tip. They can also be identified by their short, black tail and grey feet. Their completely black tail makes them the only woodswallow lacking white on the tail. Males and females are identical in appearance. Juveniles have a more brownish plumage around their head and mantle that is usually heavily striated. They have a buff tint on their chest and a brownish bill with a dark tip. White-breasted woodswallows can grow to a maximum known size of 18 centimetres (7.1 in) and weigh between 35 and 45 grams (1.2 and 1.6 oz). The nine subspecies can be separated by small differences in color, overall size, wing length and bill size.

== Distribution and habitat ==
Throughout their vast distribution across Australasia, white breasted woodswallows can be found in forests, open woodlands and semi-arid plains, with a mixture of vegetation including shrubs, mangroves, forest clearings and grasses, often near watercourses. They are found at elevations from sea level to 1,500 m (4,900 ft). They are partially migratory, with southern flocks moving north during Autumn and returning south in the spring.

== Behaviour ==
The white-breasted woodswallow has large, pointed wings and is very agile in powered and gliding flight. It is fast-flying and is one of few passerines that can soar. Even with their small statue, they can be aggressive birds whom are quite territorial with groups mobbing larger birds as a form of defense. Out of breeding season, woodswallows are quite nomadic, chasing flying insects and roosting in large flocks. They are generally seen in flocks of 10-50 birds, sometimes up to 100 to a flock. Flocks tend to cluster together in the evening to roost. They are social birds, well known for their habit of huddling up together tightly in flocks, usually along a branch or powerline. This behaviour enables the birds to maintain heat and conserve energy.

=== Breeding ===
The breeding season of the white-breasted woodswallow varies throughout its range. In northern areas breeding usually occurs between March and May and in the southern ranges occurring between August and January, pre and during the wet season. The female sexual display to invite copulation includes extending the wings over the back in a V, whilst trembling toward a male/s, then waggling the tail and quietly making an 'eep' call. They are cooperative breeders, with birds other than parents assisting with care for offspring. Both sexes participate in building nests, incubating eggs and feeding young birds. The shallow, bowl-shaped nest is built from grass, twigs and roots and lined with fine grass. Nests are situated in tree forks or hollow stumps. Woodswallows are also known to recycle abandoned magpie-lark nests to use as their own. The normal clutch size is between 2 and 5 eggs. These are tapered oval-shaped and cream or pinkish in color with darker brown speckles. The eggs are incubated for 15 days.

=== Food and feeding ===
Despite having a bifurcated (divided) brush-tipped tongue, which is usually associated with nectar feeders, woodswallows are insectivores primarily feeding on insects caught on the wings in flight or from a perch, and occasionally feeding on the nectar of flowers. Although they mostly feed on insects caught in flight, woodswallows also forage on the ground or in the tree canopy. Feeding can often be communal when the catch is too large for one bird.

== Conservation status ==
With an extensive range, the white-breasted woodswallow does not fall into vulnerable species categories. It has a stable and large population size justifying its allocation as Least Concern. There is no evidence of the species decline and the species is recognised as common and therefore there is no alert for Artamus leucorynchus to be recognised as vulnerable throughout is localities.

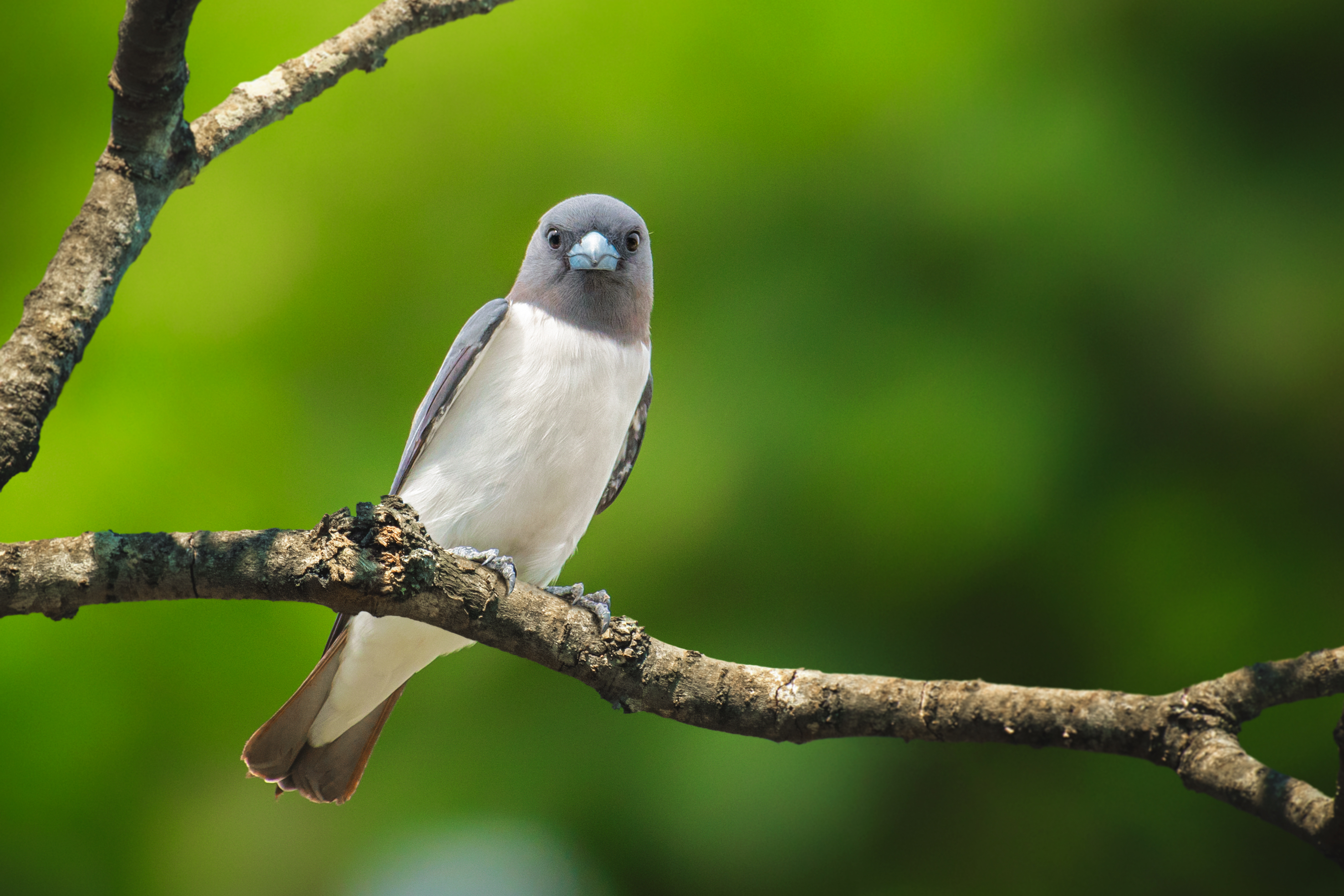

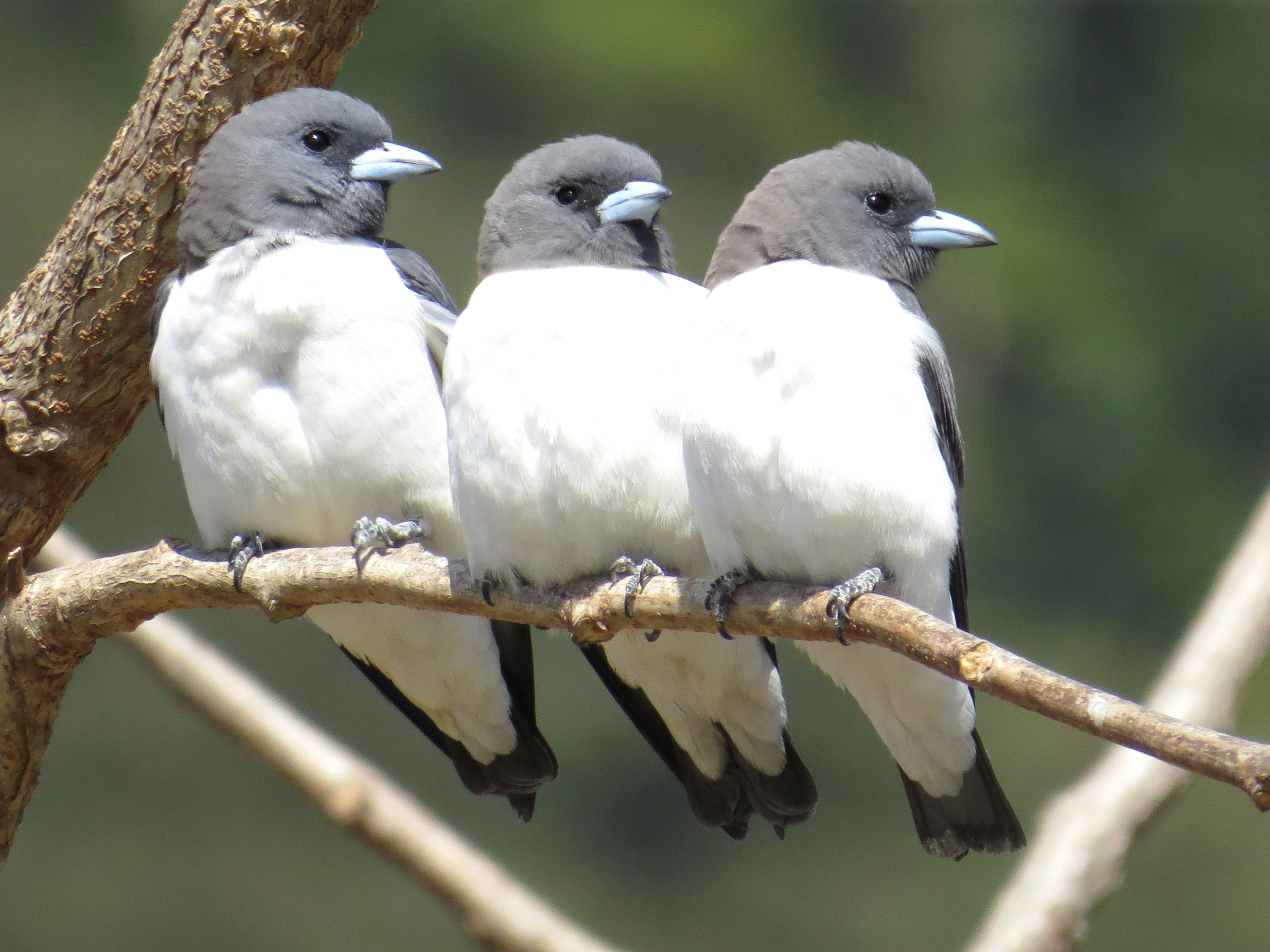

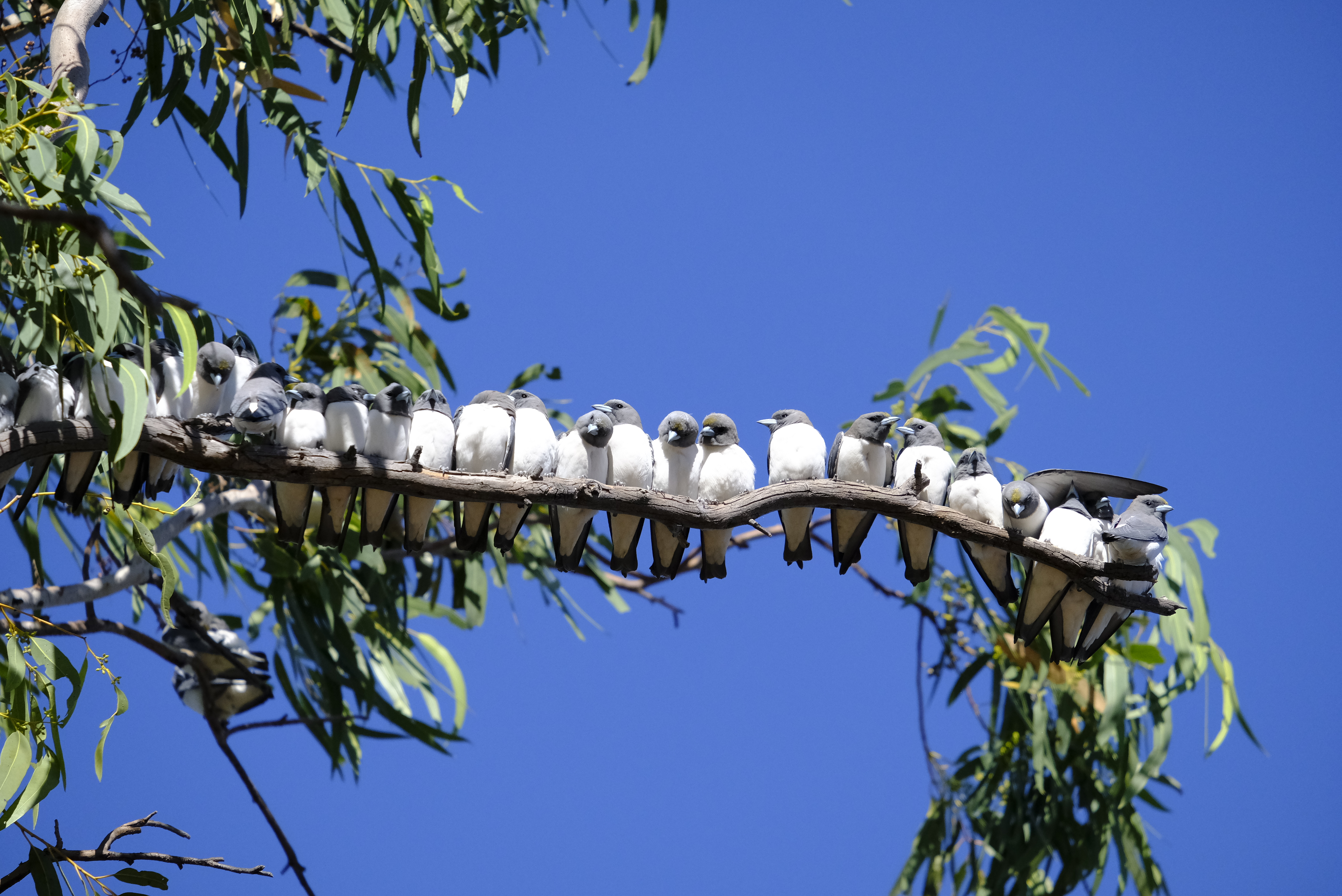
