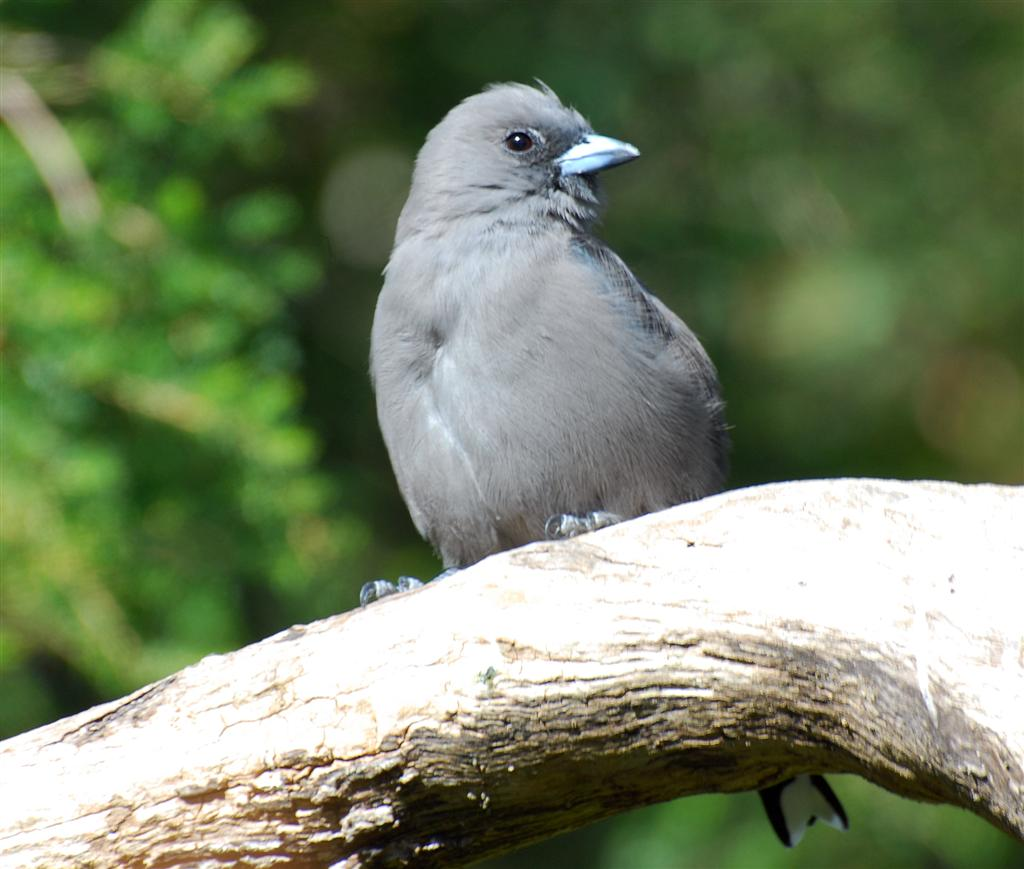
- Dusky woodswallow (Artamus cyanopterus)

Scientific classification
- Kingdom: Animalia
- Phylum: Chordata
- Class: Aves
- Order: Passeriformes
- Family: Artamidae
- Subfamily: Artaminae; C. G. Sibley & J. A. Ahlquist, 1990
- Genus: Artamus; Vieillot, 1816

Type species
- "Langraien" Buffon=Lanius leucorhynchus Linnaeus, 1771

Species
- 11, see text

= Woodswallow =

Woodswallows

Genus of birds

Woodswallows are soft-plumaged, sombre-coloured passerine birds in the genus Artamus. The woodswallows are either treated as a subfamily, Artaminae, in an expanded family Artamidae (also including the subfamily Cracticinae), or as the only genus in that family (with the butcherbirds, currawongs, and allies placed in a separate family, Cracticidae). The generic name, which in turn gives rise to the family name, is derived from the Ancient Greek artamos, meaning butcher or murder. The name was given due to their perceived similarity to shrikes. A former common name for the group was "swallow-starlings".

== Taxonomy ==
The genus Artamus was introduced in 1816 by the French ornithologist Louis Vieillot to accommodate a single species, the "Langraien", that had been described in 1770 by the French naturalist, the Comte de Buffon. The "Langraien" is the white-breasted woodswallow that had been assigned the binomial name Lanius leucorhynchus by the Swedish naturalist Carl Linnaeus in 1771. It is the type species of the genus. The genus name is from Ancient Greek αρταμος/artamos meaning "butcher" or "murderer".

== Distribution ==
The woodswallows have an Australasian distribution, with most species occurring in Australia and New Guinea. The ashy woodswallow has an exclusively Asian distribution, ranging from India and Sri Lanka through South East Asia to China, and the most widespread species is the white-breasted woodswallow, which ranges from Peninsular Malaysia through to Australia in the south and Vanuatu and New Caledonia. The group reaches the easternmost extent of its distribution in Fiji with the endemic Fiji woodswallow.

== Description ==
Woodswallows are smooth, agile flyers with moderately large, semi-triangular wings. They are among the very few passerines birds that soar, and can often be seen feeding just above the treetops. One sedentary species aside, they are nomads, following the best conditions for flying insects, and often roosting in large flocks.

Although woodswallows have a brush-tipped tongue they seldom use it for gathering nectar.

The nests of woodswallows are loosely constructed from fine twigs, and both parents help rear the young.

== Species ==
The genus contains 11 species:

Image	Common name	Scientific name	Distribution
	Ashy woodswallow	Artamus fuscus	India to southeast China and Indochina
	White-breasted woodswallow	Artamus leucorynchus	Andaman Islands, Indonesian Archipelago, Philippines, New Guinea region, north, east Australia, Vanuatu, New Caledonia and Palau (west Caroline Islands, west Micronesia)
	Fiji woodswallow	Artamus mentalis	Viti Levu, Vanua Levu, Taveuni and satellites (Fiji, southwest Polynesia)
	Ivory-backed woodswallow	Artamus monachus	Sulawesi, Lembeh (east of northeast Sulawesi), Togian Islands (between northeast and central east Sulawesi), Butung (south of southeast Sulawesi), Banggai Islands and Sula Islands is. (east of Sulawesi)
	Great woodswallow	Artamus maximus	montane New Guinea
	White-backed woodswallow	Artamus insignis	New Ireland and New Britain (east Bismarck Archipelago)
	Masked woodswallow	Artamus personatus	Australia (except north Cape York Peninsula and Tasmania)
	White-browed woodswallow	Artamus superciliosus	widely distributed in Australia
	Black-faced woodswallow	Artamus cinereus	east Lesser Sunda Islands, Australia and central south New Guinea
	Dusky woodswallow	Artamus cyanopterus	south, east Australia and Tasmania
	Little woodswallow	Artamus minor	Australia (except south, Tasmania)
