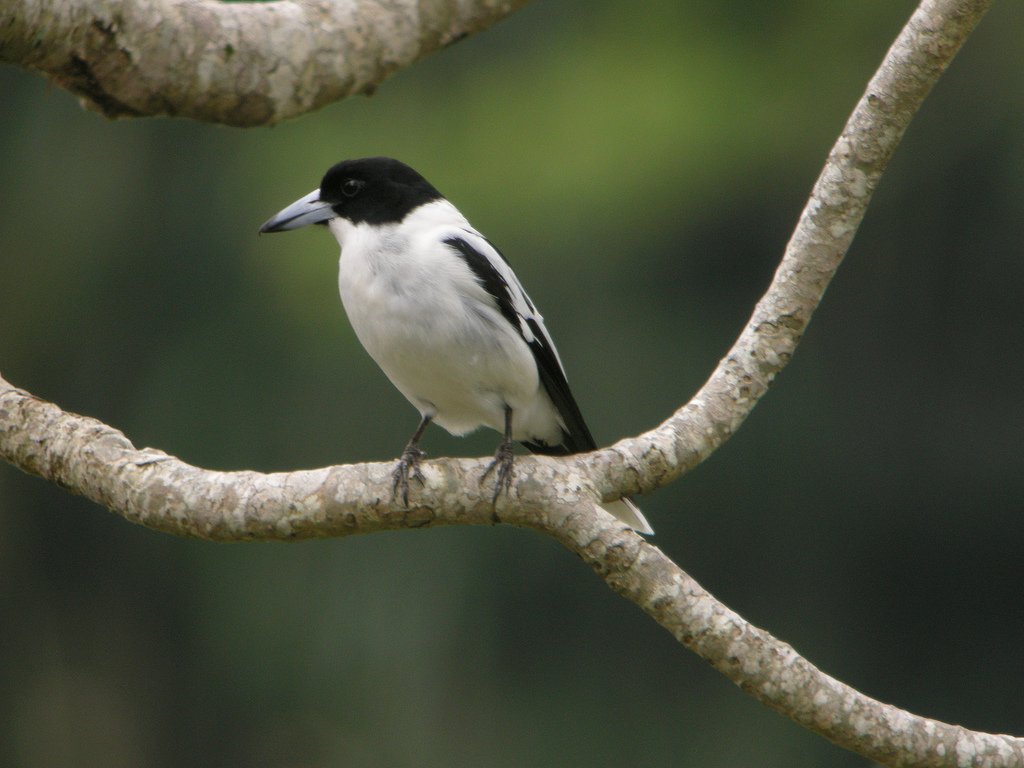

Conservation status
- Least Concern (IUCN 3.1)

Scientific classification
- Kingdom: Animalia
- Phylum: Chordata
- Class: Aves
- Order: Passeriformes
- Family: Artamidae
- Subfamily: Cracticinae
- Genus: Cracticus
- Species: C. mentalis

Binomial name
- Cracticus mentalis Salvadori & D'Albertis, 1875

= Black-backed butcherbird =

Species of bird

The black-backed butcherbird (Cracticus mentalis) is a species of bird in the family Artamidae. It is found in southern New Guinea and Cape York Peninsula in Queensland, Australia.

== Taxonomy ==
The black-backed butcherbird was first described by Italian explorers and naturalists Tommaso Salvadori and Luigi D'Albertis in 1876. Although its scientific name translates as "mental noisy bird", the species epithet mentalis refers to its chin not its mind. It is one of six (or seven) members of the genus Cracticus known as butcherbirds. Within the genus, it is most closely related to the grey and silver-backed butcherbirds. The three form a monophyletic group—the subgenus Bulestes—within the genus, having diverged from ancestors of the pied butcherbird around five million years ago.

An alternate common name is white-throated butcherbird to distinguish it from the pied butcherbird, which has a black throat.

Gregory Mathews described the Australian population as a separate subspecies kempi in 1912, citing less white plumage on the nape and tail. However Amadon did not observe this difference.

The butcherbirds, Australian magpie and currawongs were placed in the family Cracticidae in 1914 by John Albert Leach after he had studied their musculature. American ornithologists Charles Sibley and Jon Ahlquist recognised the close relationship between woodswallows and the butcherbirds in 1985, and combined them into a Cracticini clade, which became the family Artamidae.

== Description ==
Like other butcherbirds, the black-backed butcherbird is a stockily built bird with a relatively large head and short wings and legs. It is around 25 cm (10 in) long. Australian birds are smaller than those from New Guinea. Its plumage is predominantly black and white. It has a black head and lores, lower back and wings, with white nape, throat and underparts. The wings feathers are edged with white. The rump and base of tail are grey. The eyes are a dark brown, the legs grey and the bill a pale bluish grey tipped with black, with a prominent hook at the end.

The plumage of the juvenile has an untidy brown and white plumage with the same general pattern as the adult, with a darker bill.

== Distribution and habitat ==
The black-backed butcherbird is found in Cape York Peninsula north of the Palmer River, and in the Trans-Fly region and vicinity of Port Moresby in New Guinea up to altitudes of 600 m (2000 ft). The habitat is savannah and open woodland.

== Behaviour ==
The black-backed butcherbird has been observed anting.

=== Feeding ===
The black-backed butcherbird is carnivorous, preying on small lizards and birds.

=== Breeding ===
Located in the fork of a tree, the nest is constructed of dry sticks with a finer material such as dried grass, bark and leaves forming a cup-shaped interior. The clutch consists of two to four (most commonly three) eggs blotched with brown over a base colour of various shades of pale greyish- or brownish-green, or red. Oval in shape, they are around 27 mm long by 20 mm wide (1.06 in × 0.79 in).
