= Songshrike =

Songshrike may refer to any of several birds of the family Cracticidae including:

- the bell-magpie
- the butcherbird
- the currawong
