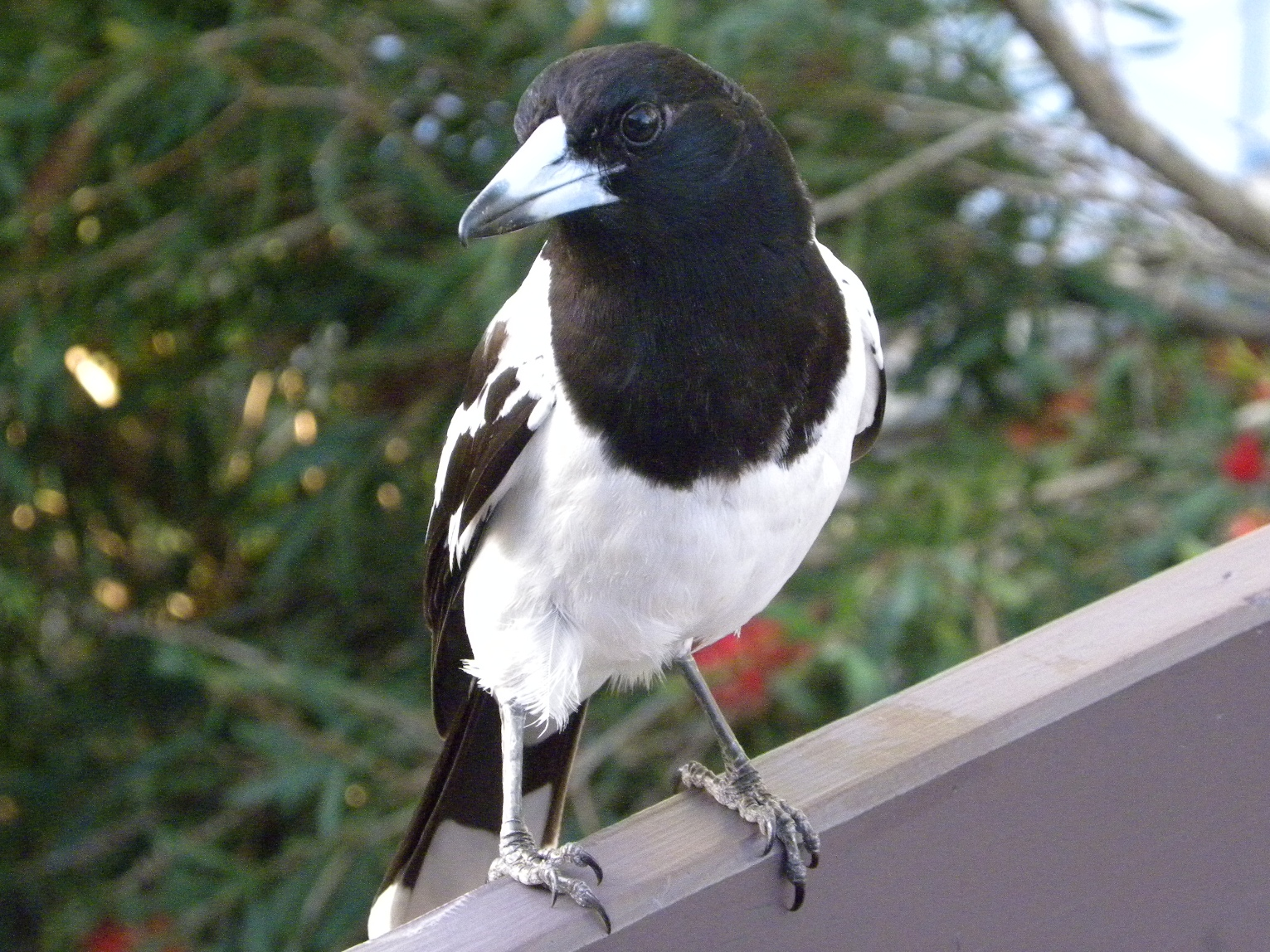

Conservation status
- Least Concern (IUCN 3.1)

Scientific classification
- Kingdom: Animalia
- Phylum: Chordata
- Class: Aves
- Order: Passeriformes
- Family: Artamidae
- Subfamily: Cracticinae
- Genus: Cracticus
- Species: C. nigrogularis

Binomial name
- Cracticus nigrogularis (Gould, 1837)
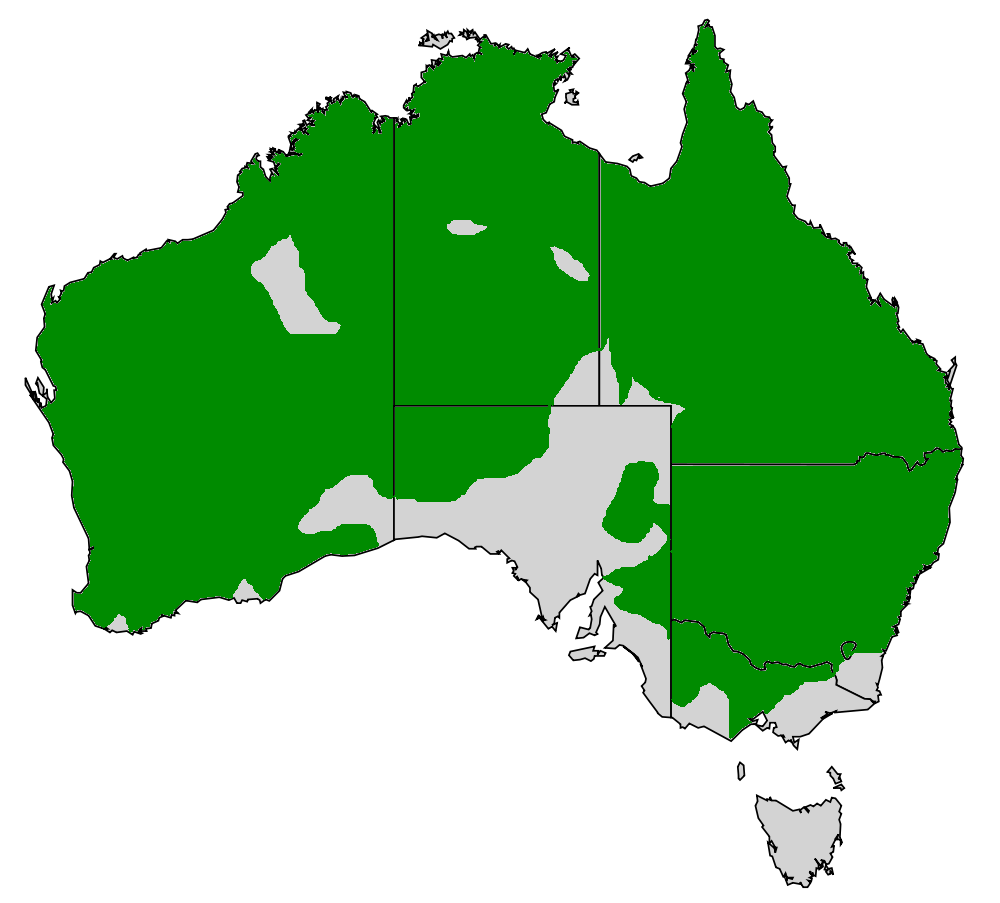
- Natural range

= Pied butcherbird =

Species of songbird native to Australia

The pied butcherbird (Cracticus nigrogularis) is a songbird native to Australia. Initially described by John Gould in 1837, it is a black-and-white bird 28 to 32 cm (11 to 12.5 in) long with a long, hooked bill. Its head and throat are black, making a distinctive hood; the mantle and much of the tail and wings are also black. The neck, underparts, and outer wing feathers are white. The juvenile and immature birds are predominantly brown and white. As they mature, black feathers replace their brown feathers. There are two recognised subspecies of pied butcherbird.

Within its range, the pied butcherbird is generally sedentary. Common in woodlands and urban environments, it is carnivorous, eating insects and small vertebrates, including birds. A tame and inquisitive bird, the pied butcherbird has been known to accept food from humans. It nests in trees, constructing a cup-shaped structure out of sticks and laying two to five eggs. The pied butcherbird engages in cooperative breeding, with a mated pair sometimes assisted by several helper birds. The troop is territorial, defending the nesting site from intruders. The International Union for Conservation of Nature (IUCN) has assessed the pied butcherbird as being of least concern on account of its large range and apparently stable population.

== Taxonomy ==
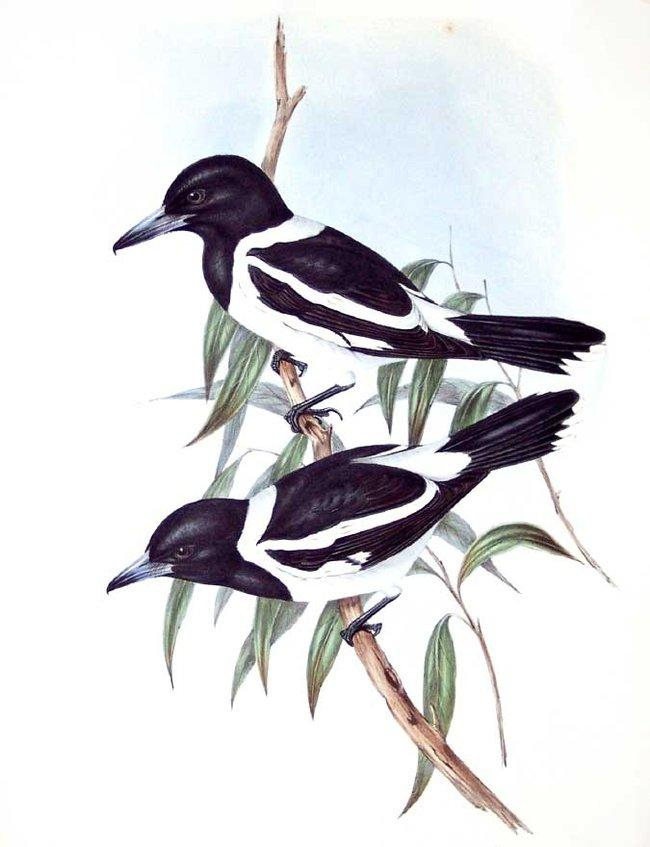
Painting by John Gould

The pied butcherbird was first described by the ornithologist John Gould in 1837 as Vanga nigrogularis. The type specimen was collected near Sydney. The species name is from the Latin words niger (black) and gula (throat). Gould described Cracticus picatus in 1848 from northern Australia, calling it "[a] miniature representative of, and nearly allied to, but distinct from, Cracticus nigrogularis." The word picatus is Latin for "daubed with pitch", hence "black patches". This was reclassified as a subspecies of C. nigrogularis. Gregory Mathews described subspecies inkermani from Queensland and subspecies mellori from Victoria and South Australia in 1912, based on smaller and larger sizes than the nominate subspecies, respectively. Both are now regarded as inseparable from the nominate subspecies. Mathews described subspecies kalgoorli from Kalgoorlie in 1912 on the basis of its longer bill than the nominate subspecies, but it is regarded today as part of subspecies picatus.

Two subspecies are recognised today. The nominate subspecies nigrogularis is found across eastern Australia, and subspecies picatus is found in the Northern Territory, Western Australia, and northern South Australia. The latter subspecies has a broader (3.7 cm (1.5 in) wide) white collar and a more whitish rump, with specimens becoming smaller in the more northern parts of the range. The border between the two subspecies lies in the Gulf Country and is known as the Carpentarian Barrier. Although there is a demarcation in physical characters, this is not borne out genetically, and birds from northwestern Australia have affinities with the eastern subspecies. Analysis of mitochondrial DNA sequences indicates the pied butcherbird has expanded rapidly from many refugia during the Pleistocene.

The pied butcherbird is one of six (or seven) members of the genus Cracticus, known colloquially as butcherbirds. Within the genus, it is most closely related to the Tagula butcherbird (C. louisiadensis) and hooded butcherbird (C. cassicus). The three form a monophyletic group within the genus, having diverged from ancestors of the grey butcherbird around five million years ago. The butcherbirds, Australian magpie (Gymnorhina tibicen), and currawongs (Strepera spp.) were placed in the family Cracticidae in 1914 by John Albert Leach after he had studied their musculature. American ornithologists Charles Sibley and Jon Ahlquist recognised the close relationship between woodswallows and the butcherbirds in 1985 and combined them into a Cracticini clade, which became the family Artamidae in 1994.

"Pied butcherbird" has been designated the official English name by the International Ornithological Committee (IOC). "Black-throated butcherbird" is an alternative common name, as are "Break o'day boy" and "organbird". Leach also called it the "black-throated crow-shrike", a name used by Gould for subspecies nigrogularis while calling subspecies picatus the "pied crow-shrike". 'Jackeroo' is a colloquial name from the Musgrave Ranges in Central Australia. Gould recorded Ka-ra-a-ra as a name used by indigenous people of Darwin. The Ngarluma people of the western Pilbara knew it as gurrbaru. In the Yuwaaliyaay dialect of the Gamilaraay language of southeastern Australia, it is buubuurrbu. Names recorded from central Australia include alpirtaka and urbura in the Upper Arrernte language.

== Description ==
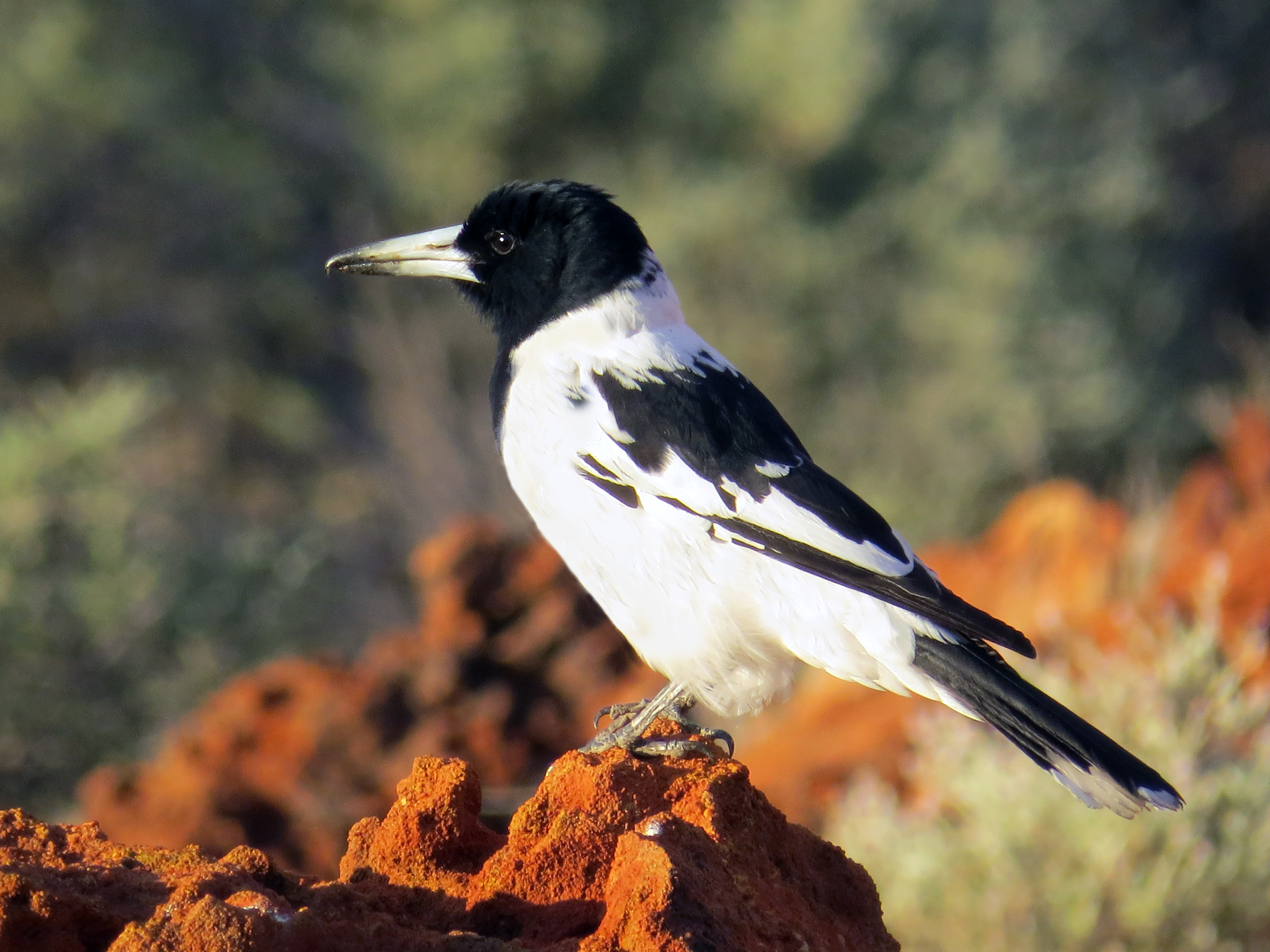
Subsp. picatus at Slate Range (Gibson Desert)

Like other butcherbirds, the pied butcherbird is stockily built with short legs and a relatively large head. It ranges from 28 to 32 cm (11 to 12.5 in) long, averaging around 31 cm (12 in), with a 51 cm (20 in) wingspan and a weight of around 120 g (4 oz). The wings are fairly long, extending to halfway along the tail when folded. Its plumage is almost wholly black and white, with very little difference between the sexes. It has a black head, nape, and throat, giving it the appearance of a black hood, which is bounded by a white neck collar, which is around 3.2 cm (1.2 in) wide. The black hood is slightly glossy in bright light, can fade a little with age, and is slightly duller and more brownish in the adult female. The neck collar in the female is slightly narrower at around 2.5 cm (1 in) and is a grey-white rather than white. Several stiff black bristles up to 1.5 cm (0.5 in) long arise from the lower lores. The upper mantle and a few of the front scapulars are white, contrasting sharply with the black lower mantle and the rest of the scapulars. The rump is pale grey, and the upper tail coverts are white. The tail is rather long, with a rounded or wedge-shaped tip. It has twelve rectrices, which are black in colour. The tail tip and outer wing feathers are white, as well as the underparts. The eyes are a dark brown, the legs are grey, and the bill is a pale bluish grey tipped with black, with a prominent hook at the end.

The juvenile pied butcherbird has dark brown instead of black plumage, lacks the pale collar, and has cream-to-buff lores, chin, and upper throat, becoming more brown on the lower throat and breast. Its underparts are off-white to cream, and the bill is dark brown. In its first year, it moults into its first immature plumage, which resembles that of the juvenile but has a more extensive dark brown throat. Its bill is blue-grey with a dark brown or blackish tip.

=== Voice ===
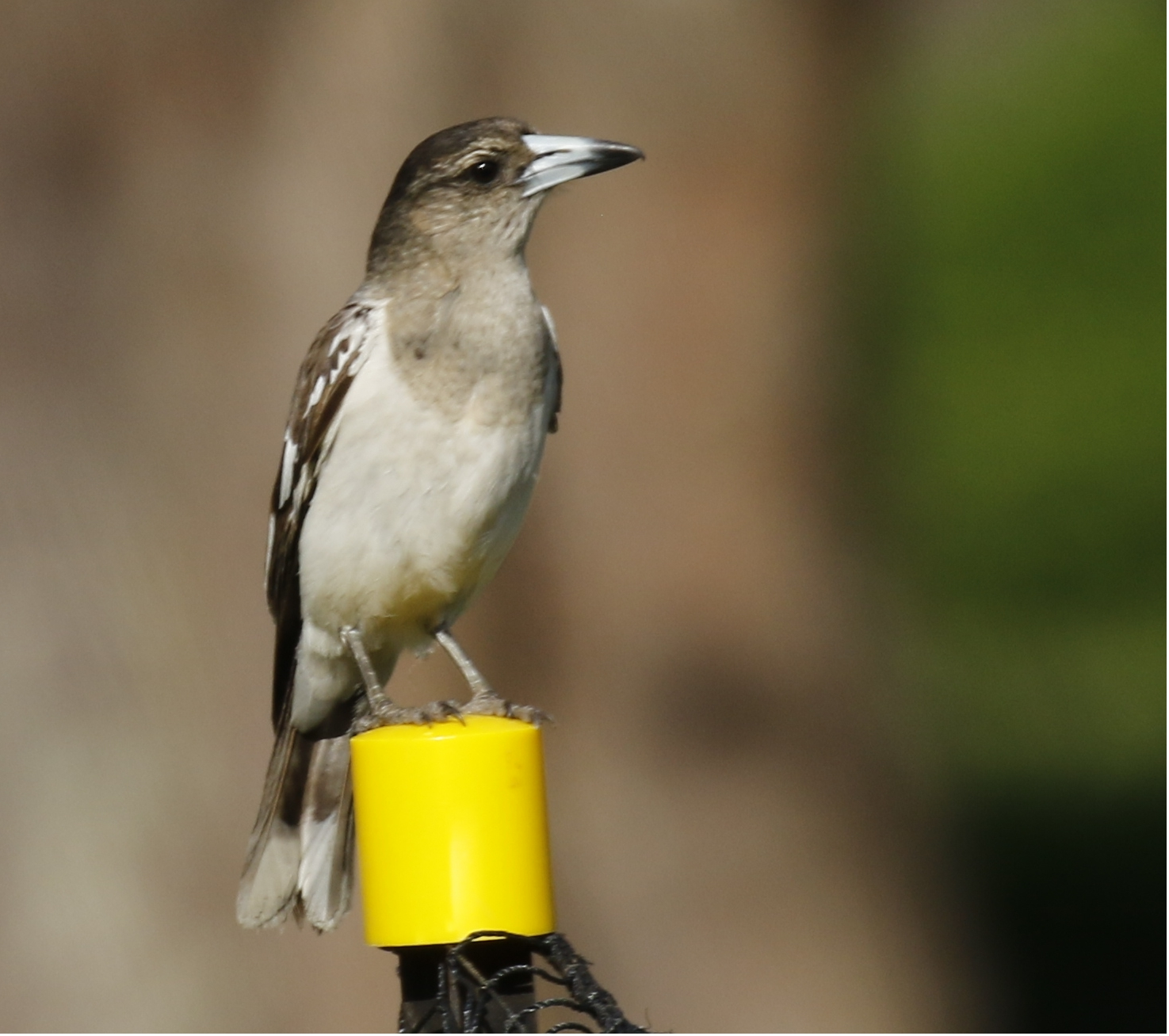
Immature bird – City Botanic Gardens – Brisbane

The pied butcherbird has been considered the most accomplished songbird in Australia, its song described as a "magic flute" by one writer, richer and clearer than the Australian magpie. Song melodies vary across the continent, and no single song is sung by the whole population. There is no clear demarcation between simple calls and elaborate songs: duets and even larger choirs are common. The species improvises extensively in creating new and complex melodies. One of its calls has been likened to the opening bars of Beethoven's Fifth Symphony. Singing often takes place at dawn and rarely late in the day. Pied butcherbirds sometimes sing on moonlit nights.

Three types of song have been described: the day song is the most common, sung by birds alone or in pairs as a chorus or an antiphonal duet, generally over the course of the day and while the birds are in flight. It appears to promote bonding and act as communication. The whisper song is sung more commonly in wet or windy weather, the singer sitting in a tree warbling soft and complex harmonies for up to 45 minutes, often mimicking many other bird species as well as dogs barking, lambs bleating, or even people whistling. In the breeding season, pied butcherbirds sing the breeding song at night until dawn, when they switch to the day song. This song is longer and more complex than the day song. In response to threats, pied butcherbirds may chatter or make a harmonic alarm call composed of short, loud, descending notes.

=== Similar species ===
The black hood helps distinguish the pied butcherbird from other butcherbirds, the Australian magpie, and the much smaller magpie-lark, the latter of which also has a much smaller beak. It has a higher-pitched call than the grey butcherbird and inhabits more open habitat. The juvenile pied butcherbird resembles the grey butcherbird: it has a buff upper throat and dark brown instead of black plumage.

== Distribution and habitat ==
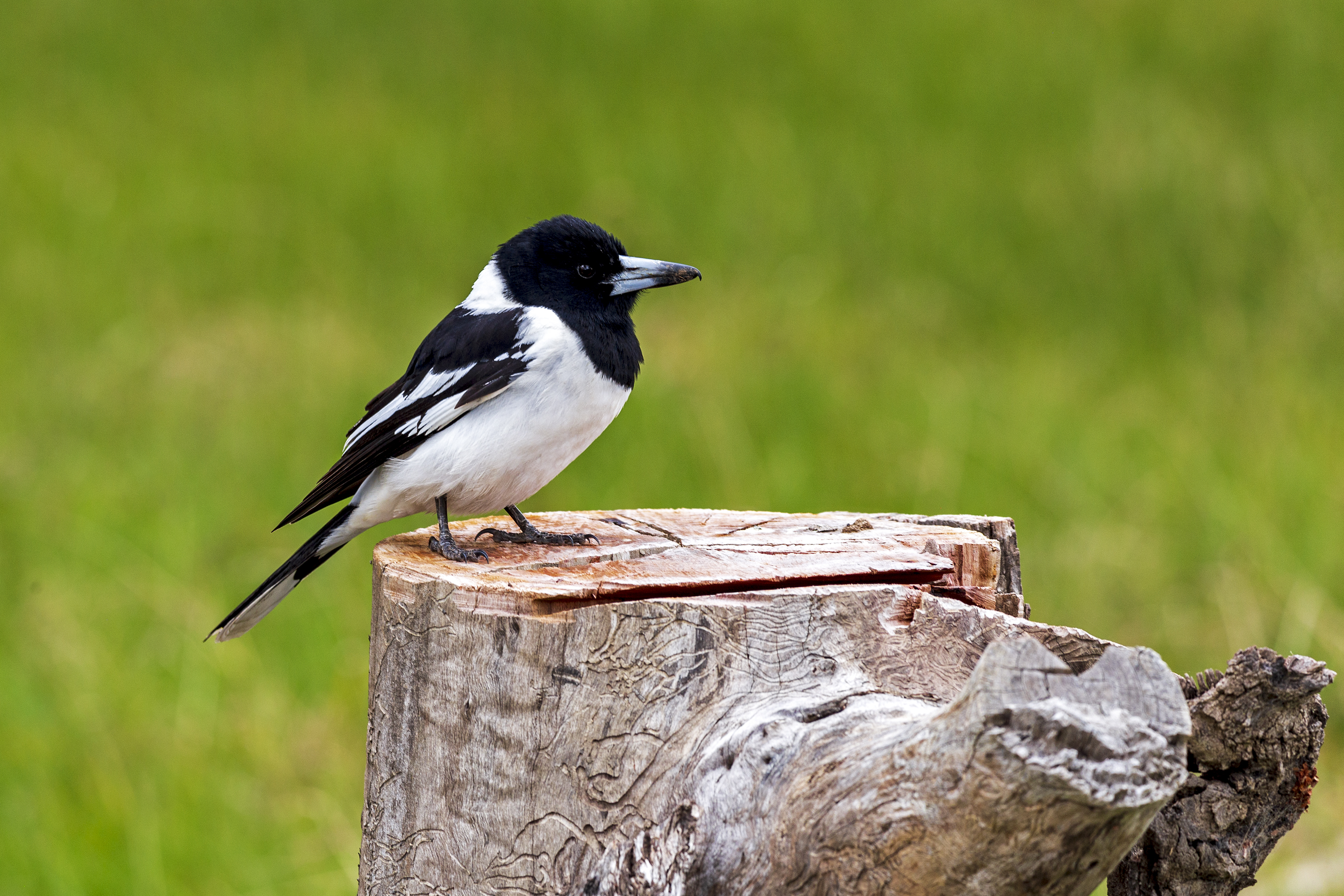
Bomen Lagoon, North Wagga Wagga, New South Wales

The pied butcherbird is found across much of Australia, except for the far south of the mainland and Tasmania. It is only rarely recorded in the Sydney Basin and absent from the Illawarra, Southern Tablelands, and south coast of New South Wales. In Victoria, it is found along the Murray Valley and west of Chiltern. In South Australia, it is not found in the north-east of the state nor on the Adelaide plain. It is found across Western Australia, though it is absent from the Great Sandy Desert. It is generally sedentary across most of its range, with minimal seasonal movements.

It is a bird of open sclerophyll forests, eucalypt and acacia woodlands, and scrublands with sparse or no understory or low cover with shrubs such as Triodia, Lomandra, or Hibbertia. It is less common in mallee scrub. In arid areas and northern Australia, it is more restricted to woodland alongside rivers and billabongs. It has become more common in south-west Western Australia with land clearing, though it has become rare around Darwin on account of urban development.

=== Conservation status ===
The pied butcherbird is listed as being a species of least concern by the IUCN on account of its large range and stable population, with no evidence of any significant decline.

== Behaviour ==
The pied butcherbird is thought to be monogamous, though its breeding habits have not been studied much. There is evidence of cooperative breeding, with some mated pairs being assisted by up to several other helper birds. During breeding season, these birds help feed the young and defend the nest. These pairs or small groups defend their territory from intruders, mobbing and chasing raptors and other birds, and occasionally dogs or people. They may attack animals (and people) that venture too close to the nest, with one bird coming front-on while the other may approach from behind. They have been known to approach humans to accept food from them.

The oldest recorded living specimen based on banding records was 22 years and 1.7 months. It was banded in Rockhampton in June 1988 and recovered in August 2010 – 7 km (4.3 mi) away. The bird was injured and had to be euthanised.

=== Breeding ===
Rush Creek, SE Queensland

Across most of its range, the pied butcherbird can generally be found breeding from winter to summer; eggs are laid anywhere from July to December, but mostly from September to November, and young can be present in the nest from August to February. There are reports of breeding outside these months, however. The nest is constructed of dry sticks with a finer material such as dried grass, black roly poly (Sclerolaena muricata), bark, and leaves forming a cup-shaped interior. It is located in the fork of a tree, often among foliage, and inconspicuously. The clutch consists of two to five (most commonly three or four) oval eggs blotched with brown over a base colour of various shades of pale greyish- or brownish-green. Larger clutches have been recorded, such as at Jandowae in Queensland, where two pairs laid eggs and were sharing incubation duties. Eggs of subspecies nigrogularis are larger, at around 33 mm long by 24 mm (1.3 by 0.95 in) wide, while those of subspecies picatus are around 31 mm long by 22 mm (1.2 by 0.85 in) wide. Incubation takes 19 to 21 days, with the eggs laid up to 48 hours apart and hatching at a similar interval. As with all passerines, the chicks are altricial—they are born naked or sparsely covered in down and blind. They spend anywhere from 25 to 33 days in the nest before fledging, though they may leave the nest early if disturbed. They are fed by their parents and helper birds. Brood parasites recorded include the pallid cuckoo (Cacomantis pallidus) and channel-billed cuckoo (Scythrops novaehollandiae).

=== Feeding ===
A Pied Butcherbird being hand-fed.

The pied butcherbird is carnivorous and eats insects such as beetles, bugs, ants, caterpillars, and cockroaches, as well as spiders and worms. It preys on vertebrates up to the size of animals such as frogs, skinks, mice, and small birds such as the silvereye (Zosterops lateralis), house sparrow (Passer domesticus), double-barred finch (Taeniopygia bichenovii), willie wagtail (Rhipidura leucophrys), and grey teal (Anas gracilis) duckling. It has been looked upon favourably by farmers, since it hunts such pests as grasshoppers and rodents. Some individuals look for scraps around houses and picnic sites and can become tame enough to be fed by people, either by hand or by tossing food in the air. The pied butcherbird also eats fruit, such as those of sandpaper figs (Ficus coronata), native cherry (Exocarpos cupressiformis), African boxthorn (Lycium ferocissimum), and grapes (Vitis vinifera), and nectar of the Darwin woollybutt (Eucalyptus miniata).

The pied butcherbird often perches on a fencepost, stump, or branch while foraging for prey. It generally pounces on victims on the ground and eats them there. At times, it may hop or run along hunting ground-based food and occasionally seize flying insects. It typically forages alone or occasionally in pairs. The pied butcherbird has been observed hunting collaboratively with the Australian hobby, either picking off common starlings or rufous-throated honeyeaters disturbed by the larger hobby or flushing out small birds from bushes, which the larger bird then hunts. The pied butcherbird sometimes stores food items by impaling them on a stick or on barbed wire or shoving them in a nook or crevice.

== Cultural significance ==
Several Australian and international composers have been inspired by and written music incorporating the songs of the pied butcherbird, including Henry Tate, David Lumsdaine (who described it as "a virtuoso of composition and improvisation"), Don Harper, Olivier Messiaen, Elaine Barkin, John Rodgers, Ron Nagorcka, and John Williamson. In the dance "Bird Song" by Siobhan Davies, the main central solo was accompanied by the call of a pied butcherbird, and this same sound provided inspiration to much of the dance, including the improvisational aspects. Composer and researcher Hollis Taylor has studied pied butcherbird songs for 12 years and has released a double CD called Absolute Bird based on fifty-plus pied butcherbird nocturnal solo songs. Taylor's "Is Birdsong Music? Outback Encounters with an Australian Songbird" offers portraits of the remote locations where the species is found.

In the now extinct Warray language spoken on the Adelaide River in Arnhem Land, Cracticus nigrogularis was known as lopolopo.
