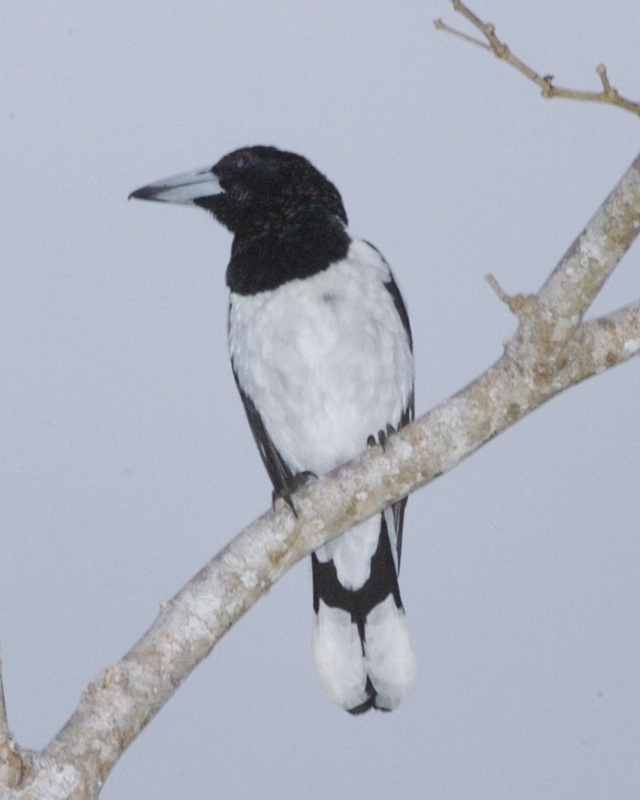
- Photo taken in Biak, Papua

Conservation status
- Least Concern (IUCN 3.1)

Scientific classification
- Kingdom: Animalia
- Phylum: Chordata
- Class: Aves
- Order: Passeriformes
- Family: Artamidae
- Subfamily: Cracticinae
- Genus: Cracticus
- Species: C. cassicus

Binomial name
- Cracticus cassicus (Boddaert, 1783)

= Hooded butcherbird =

Species of bird

The hooded butcherbird (Cracticus cassicus) is a species of passerine bird in the family Artamidae. It is found in New Guinea. Its natural habitat is subtropical or tropical moist lowland forest.

== Taxonomy ==
The hooded butcherbird was described by the French polymath Georges-Louis Leclerc, Comte de Buffon in 1780 in his Histoire Naturelle des Oiseaux from a specimen collected in New Guinea by the naturalist Pierre Sonnerat. The bird was also illustrated in a hand-coloured plate engraved by François-Nicolas Martinet in the Planches Enluminées D'Histoire Naturelle which was produced under the supervision of Edme-Louis Daubenton to accompany Buffon's text. Neither the plate caption nor Buffon's description included a scientific name but in 1783 the Dutch naturalist Pieter Boddaert coined the binomial name Ramphastos cassicus in his catalogue of the Planches Enluminées. The type locality was restricted to Vogelkop (Bird's Head Peninsula), northwest New Guinea, by the American biologist Ernst Mayr in 1941. The hooded butcherbird is now placed in the genus Cracticus that was introduced in 1816 by the French ornithologist Louis Pierre Vieillot with the hooded butcherbird as the type species. The generic name is from the Ancient Greek kraktikos meaning "noisy" or "clamorous". The specific epithet cassicus is from the French "Cassican" which in turn is from "Cassique", the French word for cacique used from orioles.

It is one of six (or seven) members of the genus Cracticus known as butcherbirds. Within the genus, it is most closely related to the Tagula butcherbird, and the two are related to the pied butcherbird of Australia. The three form a monophyletic group within the genus, having diverged from ancestors of the grey butcherbird around five million years ago.

Two subspecies are recognised. The nominate race cassicus is found on mainland New Guinea and islands to the west, as well as Kairiru, Mushu and Basilaki Islands. The larger race hercules occurs on the D'entrecasteaux Archipelago and Trobriand Islands.

A local name in Ketengban is moro-moro.

== Description ==
Measuring 32–35 cm in length, the male and female are similar in appearance. The plumage is predominantly black and white, the bird bearing a black head, nape and throat, white underparts, rump, and back, and black and white mantle. The tail is black, with a broad white tip. The robust pale bluish-grey bill is hooked and tipped black. The iris is black or dark brown, and the legs and feet are dark grey to black. It can be distinguished from the black-backed butcherbird by its black throat.

The hooded butcherbird has a complex fluting song, made up of many varied components. Birds may duet with each other, or mimic other species such as the rusty pitohui, little shrikethrush, spangled drongo, or helmeted friarbird.

== Distribution and habitat ==
Found on New Guinea and surrounding islands, the hooded butcherbird inhabits forested country mainly in lowland areas to elevations of 650 m, or occasionally 1450 m. It is fairly common and may also be found close to human habitation in coconut groves.

== Behaviour ==
The hooded butcherbird is carnivorous. Birds are found in pairs or small family groups.

Records indicate breeding may occur at any time. Located on a branch 8.5–25 m above ground, the nest is a bowl constructed of twigs and sticks. Two or three pale olive-brown or -green eggs are laid, blotched darker brown and measuring 31.8-35.6 x 23.7-25.6 mm.
