= Miostrepera =

Miostrepera Temporal range: early Miocene

Scientific classification
- Kingdom: Animalia
- Phylum: Chordata
- Class: Aves
- Order: Passeriformes
- Family: Artamidae
- Subfamily: Cracticinae
- Genus: †Miostrepera; Worthy et al., 2025
- Species: †M. canora

Binomial name
- †Miostrepera canora Worthy et al., 2025

Extinct genus of large cracticine

Miostrepera is an extinct genus of large cracticine from the early Miocene of Bannockburn Formation of St Bathans Fauna, New Zealand.

== Discovery ==
The discovery of passerine fossils of St Bathans fauna dates back to 2007, which one of them, a scapula, was referred to a cracticine. Subsequently, the fossil passerine remains have been increased to over 195. When it comes to 2025, cracticine remains discovered in 2013 and 2014 was described as a new genus Miostrepera canora by Trevor H. Worthy and colleagues. the holotype of Miostrepera (CM 2013.18.708 ) , a proximal right humerus, was collected in 2013. And the paratype (CM 2013.18.1106), a distal right humerus, was collected in 2014. The genus comes from the genus Strepera, and the epithet species name canora refers to how the genus may have similar calls to extant cracticine genera (specifically Strepera and Gymnorhina).

== Paleobiology ==
Miostrepera is a member of the St Bathans Fauna, which has yielded a number of bird species. It was also the second known passerine of the fauna followed by the New Zealand wren Kuiornis indicator. The discovery also shows an overwater dispersal of cracticines from Australia to New Zealand during the Miocene. Cracticines are absent now in New Zealand, but the Australian magpie (Gymnorhina tibicen) was introduced to New Zealand via Australia.
