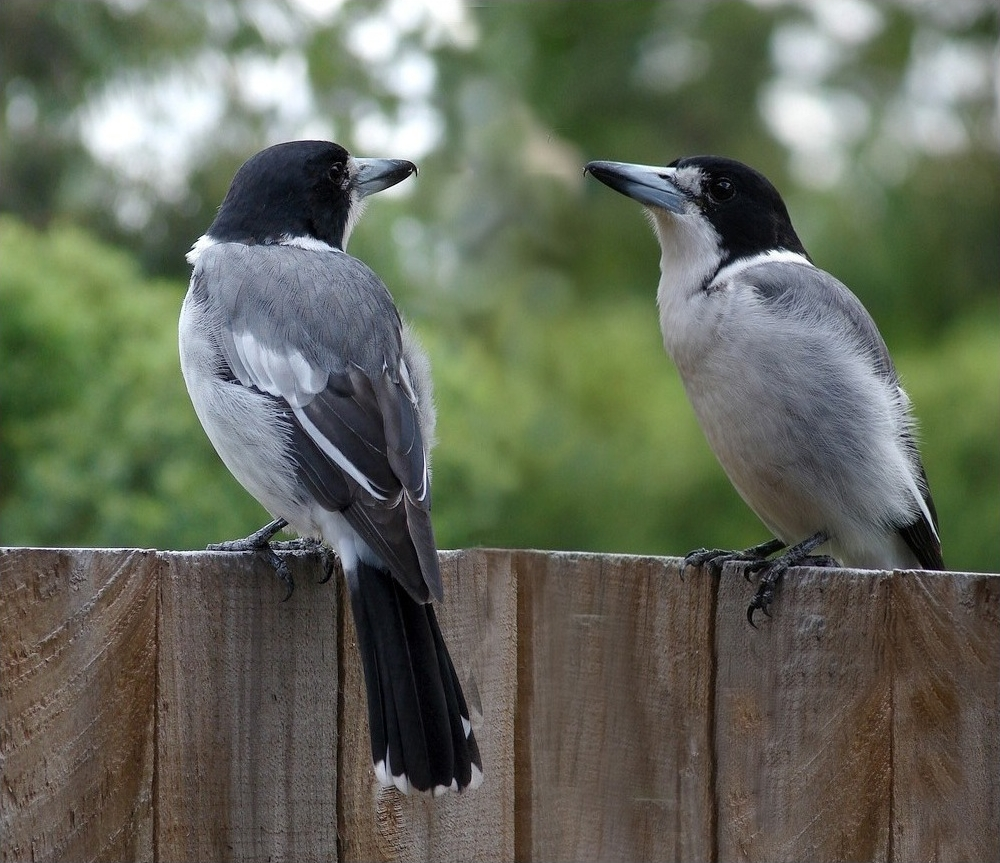
- Two grey butcherbirds

Scientific classification
- Kingdom: Animalia
- Phylum: Chordata
- Class: Aves
- Order: Passeriformes
- Family: Artamidae
- Subfamily: Cracticinae

Genera
- Gymnorhina; Melloria; Cracticus

= Butcherbird =

Butcherbirds

Australasian songbird

Butcherbirds are songbirds in the Cracticinae subfamily of the Artamidae family. Most species are placed in the genus Cracticus, while the black butcherbird is placed in the monotypic genus Melloria. The Australian magpie is a closely related species placed in the separate monotypic genus Gymnorhina and is the closest relative of the black butcherbird. Butcherbirds are native to Australasia. They get their name from their tendency of impaling prey on branches or in branch forks and tearing it apart, resembling the way butchers prepare meat.

== Taxonomy ==
Together with three species of currawong and two species of peltops, butcherbirds form the subfamily Cracticinae in the family Artamidae. Despite the name of the Australian magpie, this family of birds is not closely related to true magpies, which are members of the family Corvidae. They are also unrelated to the shrike, despite similarly impaling prey.

== Description ==
Butcherbirds are large songbirds, being between 30 and 40 cm (12–16 in) in length. Their colour ranges from black-and-white to mostly black with added grey plumage, depending on the species. They have a large, straight bill with a distinctive hook at the end which is used to skewer their prey. They have high-pitched complex songs, which are used to defend their essentially year-round group territories. Unlike birds of extratropical Eurasia and the Americas, both sexes sing prolifically. The young are more brown.

== Feeding and distribution ==
Butcherbirds are insect eaters for the most part, but will also feed on small lizards and other vertebrates. They get their name from their habit of impaling captured prey on a thorn, tree fork, or crevice. This "larder" is used to support the victim while it is being eaten, to store prey for later consumption, or to attract mates.

A Pied Butcherbird accepting food from a person's hand.

Butcherbirds are the ecological counterparts of the shrikes, mainly found in Eurasia and Africa, which are only distantly related, but share the "larder" habit; shrikes are also sometimes called "butcherbirds". Butcherbirds live in a variety of habitats from tropical rainforest to arid shrubland. Like many similar species, they have adapted well to urbanisation and can be found in leafy suburbs throughout Australia. They are opportunistic, showing little fear and readily taking food offerings to the point of becoming semi-tame.

== Breeding ==
Female butcherbirds lay between two and five eggs in a clutch, with the larger clutch sizes in more open-country species. Except in the rainforest-dwelling hooded and black butcherbirds, cooperative breeding occurs, with many individuals delaying dispersal to rear young. The nest is made from twigs, high up in a fork of a tree. The young will remain with their mother until almost fully grown. They tend to trail behind their mother and "squeak" incessantly while she catches food for them.

== Species ==
- Genus Gymnorhina
  - Australian magpie (Gymnorhina tibicen)
- Genus Melloria
  - Black butcherbird (Melloria quoyi)
- Genus Cracticus
  - Grey butcherbird (Cracticus torquatus)
  - Silver-backed butcherbird (Cracticus argenteus) - alternately a subspecies of C. torquatus
  - Hooded butcherbird (Cracticus cassicus)
  - Tagula butcherbird (Cracticus louisiadensis)
  - Black-backed butcherbird (Cracticus mentalis)
  - Pied butcherbird (Cracticus nigrogularis)
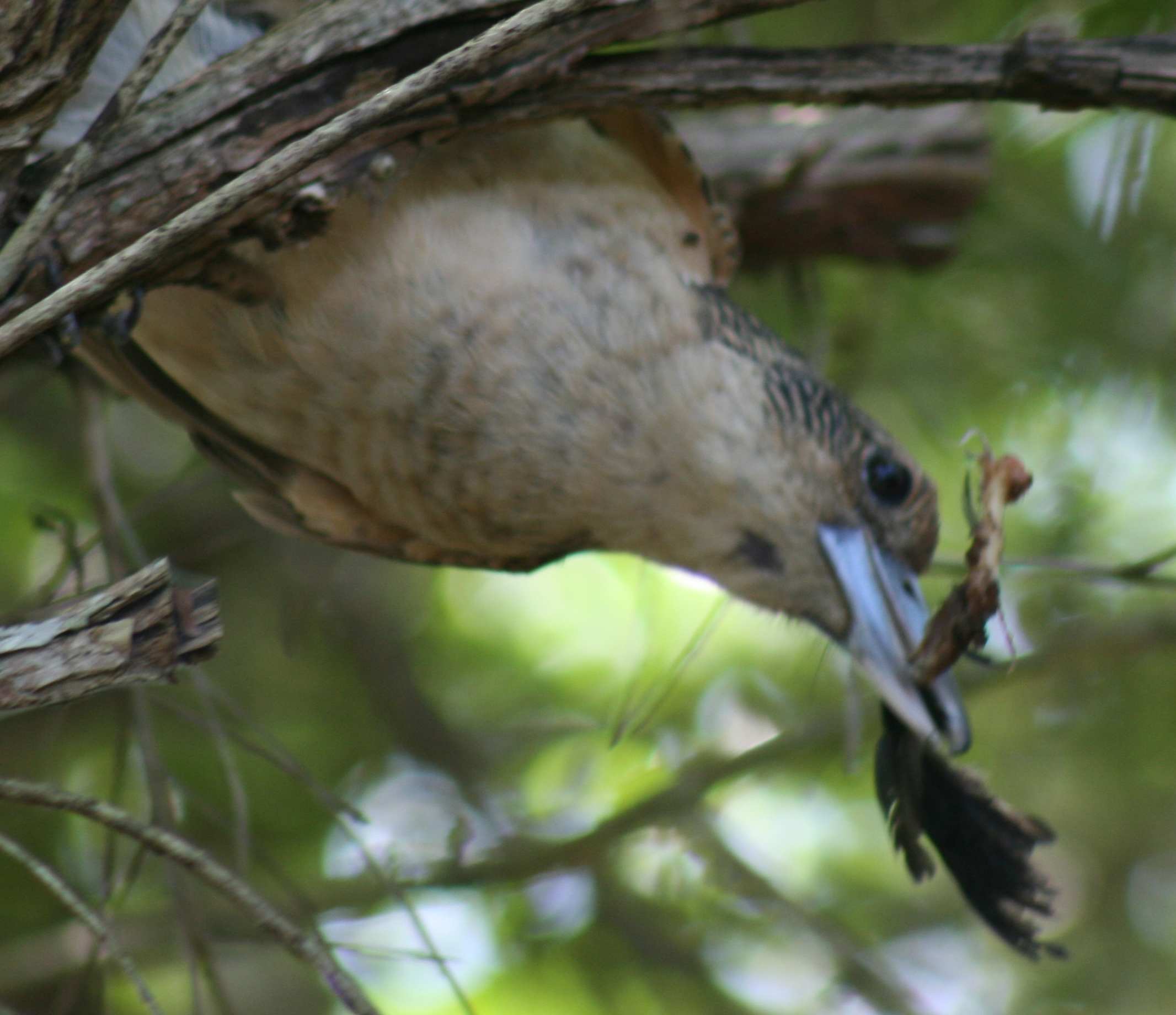
Black butcherbird with the remains of a wing in Cairns, Australia.

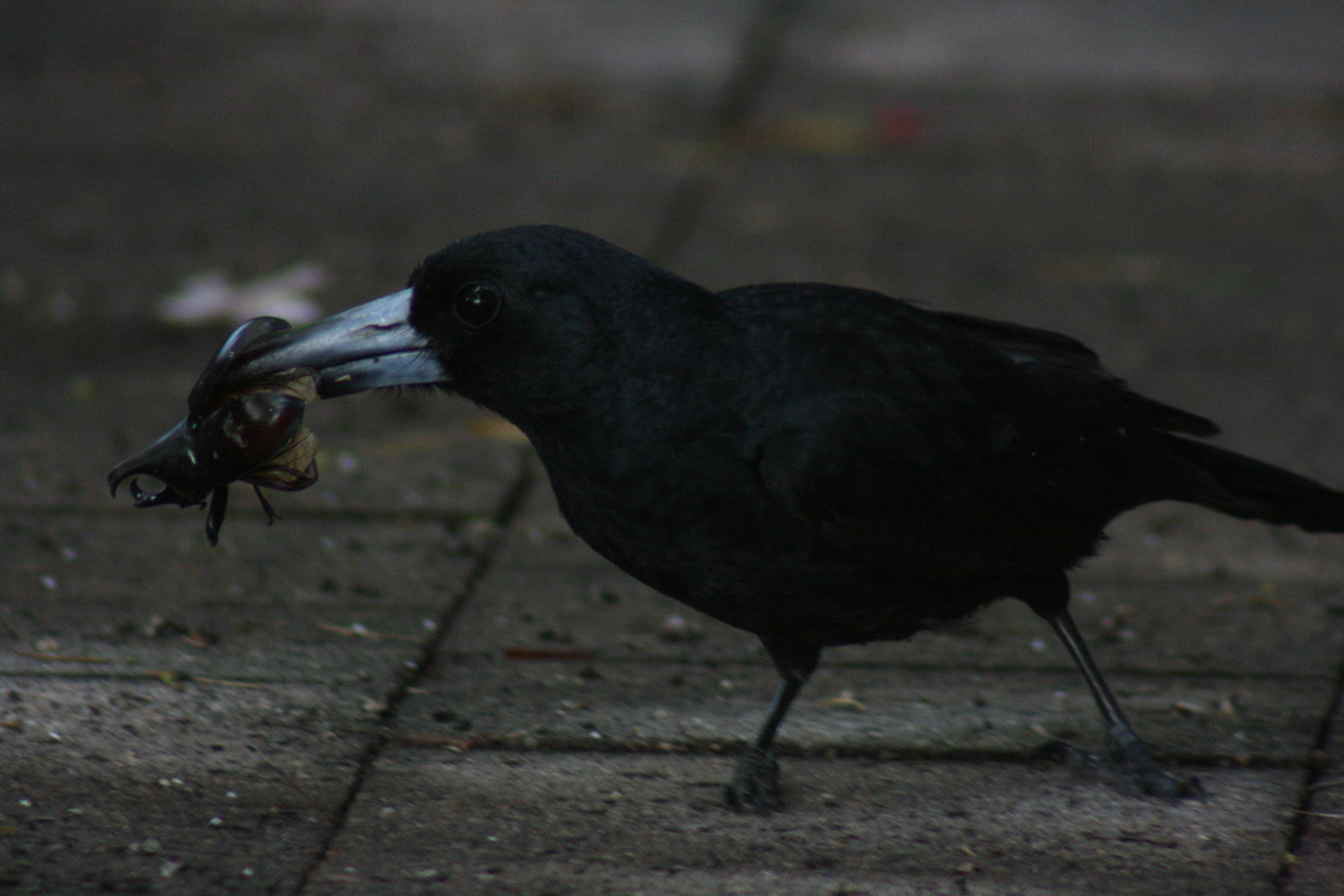
Eating a rhinoceros beetle
