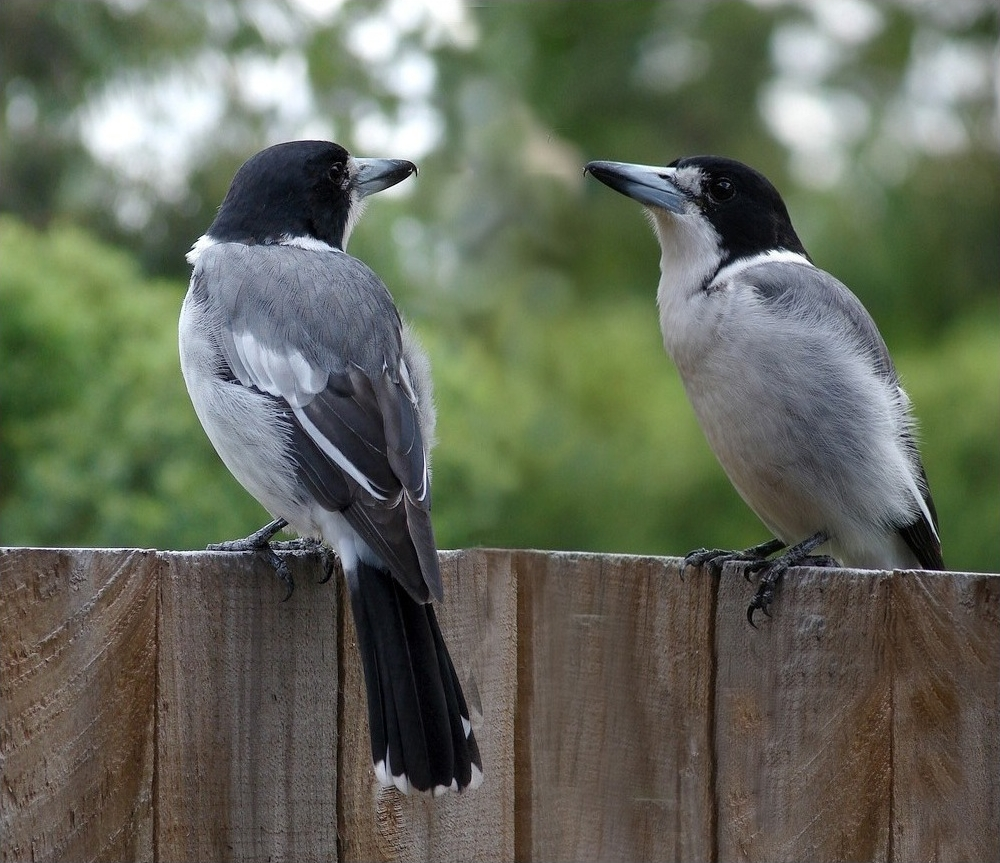
- Two grey butcherbirds (Cracticus torquatus)

Scientific classification
- Kingdom: Animalia
- Phylum: Chordata
- Class: Aves
- Order: Passeriformes
- Family: Artamidae
- Subfamily: Cracticinae
- Genus: Cracticus; Vieillot, 1816

Type species
- Ramphastos cassicus Boddaert, 1783

= Cracticus =

Genus of birds

Cracticus is a genus of butcherbirds native to Australasia. They are large songbirds, being between 30 and 40 cm (12–16 in) in length. Their colour ranges from black-and-white to mostly black with added grey plumage, depending on the species. They have a large, straight bill with a distinctive hook at the end which is used to skewer prey. They have high-pitched complex songs, which are used to defend their essentially year-round group territories: unlike birds of extratropical Eurasia and the Americas, both sexes sing prolifically.

== Taxonomy ==
The genus Cracticus was introduced by the French ornithologist Louis Pierre Vieillot in 1816 with the hooded butcherbird (Cracticus cassicus) as the type species. The name is from the Ancient Greek kraktikos meaning "noisy" or "clamorous".

Together with three species of currawong (Strepera) and two species of Peltops, the black butcherbird (Melloria quoyi), and the Australian magpie (Gymnorhina tibicen), they form the subfamily Cracticinae within the family Artamidae.

The genus contains six species:

Image	Scientific name	Common name	Distribution
	Cracticus torquatus	Grey butcherbird	Australia
	Cracticus argenteus	Silver-backed butcherbird	northern Australia
	Cracticus cassicus	Hooded butcherbird	New Guinea.
	Cracticus louisiadensis	Tagula butcherbird	Tagula Island in Papua New Guinea.
	Cracticus mentalis	Black-backed butcherbird	southern New Guinea and Cape York Peninsula.
	Cracticus nigrogularis	Pied butcherbird	Australia.

The black butcherbird, Melloria quoyi, is sometimes called Cracticus quoyi.

== Biology ==
They are insect eaters for the most part, but will also feed on small lizards and other vertebrates. They get their name from their habit of impaling captured prey on a thorn, tree fork, or crevice. This "larder" is used to support the victim while it is being eaten, to store prey for later consumption, or to attract mates.

They are the ecological counterparts of the shrikes, mainly found in Eurasia and Africa, which are only distantly related, but share the "larder" habit; shrikes are also sometimes called "butcherbirds". They live in a variety of habitats from tropical rainforest to arid shrubland. Like many similar species, they have adapted well to urbanisation and can be found in leafy suburbs throughout Australia. They are opportunistic, showing little fear and readily taking food offerings to the point of becoming semi-tame.

Females lay between two and five eggs in a clutch, with the larger clutch sizes in more open-country species. Except in the rainforest-dwelling hooded and black butcherbirds, cooperative breeding occurs, with many individuals delaying dispersal to rear young. The nest is made from twigs, high up in a fork of a tree. The young will remain with their mother until almost fully grown. They tend to trail behind their mother and "squeak" incessantly while she catches food for them.
