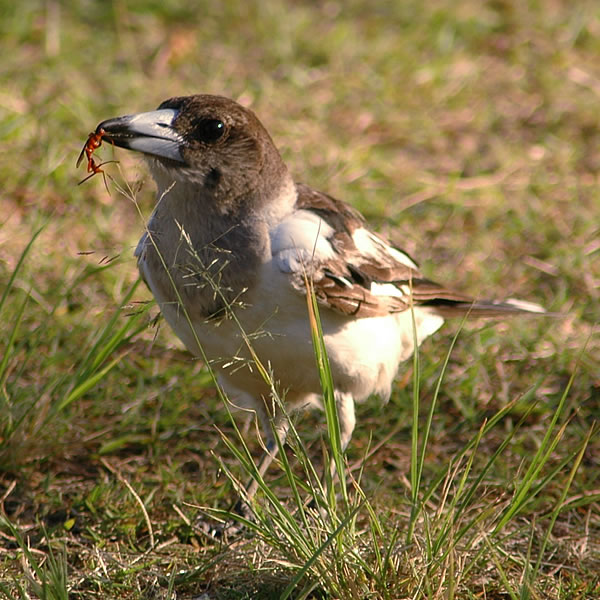
- Pied butcherbird (Cracticus nigrogularis)

Scientific classification
- Kingdom: Animalia
- Phylum: Chordata
- Class: Aves
- Order: Passeriformes
- Family: Artamidae
- Subfamily: Cracticinae; Chenu & Des Murs, 1853

= Cracticinae =

Subfamily of birds

The Cracticinae, bellmagpies and allies, gathers together 13 species of mostly crow-like birds native to Australasia and nearby areas.

Historically, the cracticines – currawongs, Australian magpie and butcherbirds – were seen as a separate family Cracticidae and, according to the 2018 Cements List, they still are. With their 1985 DNA study, Sibley and Ahlquist recognised the close relationship between the woodswallows and the butcherbirds in 1985, and placed them in a Cracticini clade, now the family Artamidae. The two species of peltops were once placed with the monarch flycatchers but are now placed here.

The cracticines have large, straight bills and mostly black, white or grey plumage. All are omnivorous to some degree: the butcherbirds mostly eat meat; Australian magpies usually forage through short grass looking for worms and other small creatures; and currawongs are true omnivores, taking fruit, grain, meat, insects, eggs and nestlings. The female constructs bulky nests from sticks, and both parents help incubate the eggs and raise the young thereafter.

The cracticines are highly intelligent and have complex songs. Particularly noteworthy are the pied butcherbird, the pied currawong and the Australian magpie.

== Species of Cracticinae ==
Five genera are recognised. The Australian magpie is classified in its own genus Gymnorhina. A 2013 molecular study has shown it to be the sister taxon to the black butcherbird (Melloria quoyi).

- Subfamily Cracticinae:

Image	Genus	Living species
	Peltops Wagler, 1829	Mountain peltops, Peltops montanus; Lowland peltops, Peltops blainvillii
	Melloria (Mathews, 1912)	Black butcherbird, Melloria quoyi
	Gymnorhina Gray, GR, 1840	Australian magpie, Gymnorhina tibicen
	Cracticus Vieillot, 1816	Grey butcherbird, Cracticus torquatus; Silver-backed butcherbird, Cracticus argenteus; Black-backed butcherbird, Cracticus mentalis; Pied butcherbird, Cracticus nigrogularis; Hooded butcherbird, Cracticus cassicus; Tagula butcherbird, Cracticus louisiadensis
	Strepera Lesson, 1831	Pied currawong, Strepera graculina; Black currawong, Strepera fuliginosa; Grey currawong, Strepera versicolor

Miostrepera canora was described from a proximal and a distal humerus and scapula found in the St Bathans fauna from the Early Miocene in Otago, New Zealand. These were most similar to modern Strepera species and reveal that the Cracticinae were previously native to Zealandia and indicates overwater dispersal.

Kurrartapu johnnguyeni was described from a proximal tarsometatarsus recovered from the Riversleigh site in Queensland. It is early Miocene in age and is closer to Strepera/Cracticus than to Peltops. The bird was likely similar in size to the extant black butcherbird.
