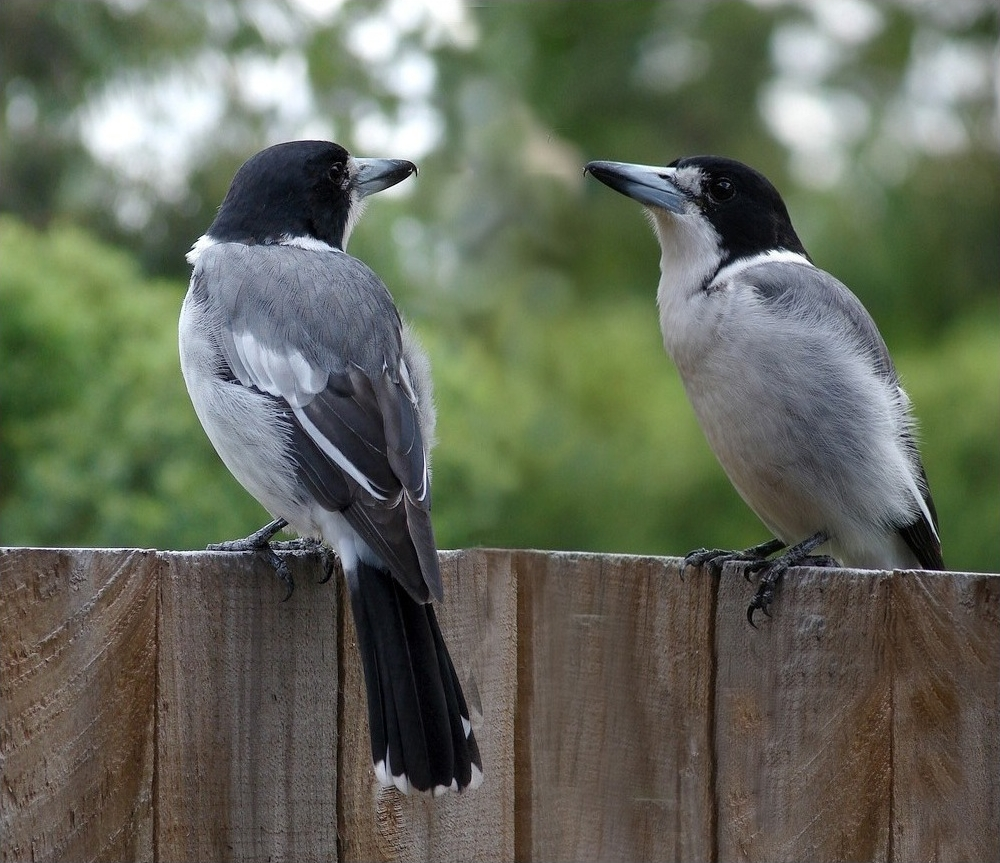
- Two perching on a garden fence in Brisbane, Australia

Conservation status
- Least Concern (IUCN 3.1)

Scientific classification
- Kingdom: Animalia
- Phylum: Chordata
- Class: Aves
- Order: Passeriformes
- Family: Artamidae
- Subfamily: Cracticinae
- Genus: Cracticus
- Species: C. torquatus

Binomial name
- Cracticus torquatus (Latham, 1801)
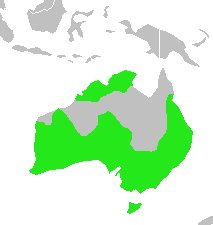
- Range

Synonyms
- Lanius torquatus Latham; Vanga destructor Temminck; Barita destructor Temminck, 1838; Bulestes torquatus Cabanis; Cracticus destructor Gould, 1848

= Grey butcherbird =

Grey Butcherbird

Species of bird

The grey butcherbird (Cracticus torquatus) is a widely distributed species endemic to Australia. It occurs in a range of different habitats including arid, semi-arid and temperate zones. It is found across southern Australia, but is absent from the deserts of central Australia and the monsoon tropics of northern Australia. It has a characteristic rollicking birdsong. It appears to be adapting well to city living, and can be encountered in the suburbs of many Australian cities including Brisbane, Melbourne, Perth, Sydney and Hobart. The grey butcherbird preys on small vertebrates including other birds.

Other birds in the same family include the Australian magpie, the currawongs, woodswallows and other members of the butcherbird genus Cracticus.

== Taxonomy ==
The grey butcherbird was first described by the English ornithologist John Latham in 1801 under the binomial name Lanius torquatus.

Closely related species include the silver-backed butcherbird (Cracticus argenteus) and the black-backed butcherbird (Cracticus mentalis). The silver-backed butcherbird (Cracticus argenteus) from Arnhem Land and northwestern Australia over to Port Hedland, originally described by John Gould in 1841, was later deemed to be a subspecies of the grey butcherbird. Recently, however, it has again been re-described as a separate species. The silver-backed butcherbird has two subspecies C. argenteus argenteus and C. a. colletti. The black-backed butcherbird occurs in Australia on the Cape York Peninsula and in Papua New Guinea and has two subspecies.

=== Subspecies ===
The grey butcherbird has three subspecies:

- C. t. torquatus in south-east Australia
- C. t. cinereus is restricted to the island of Tasmania.
- C. t. leucopterus is widespread; its distribution stretches from the west to the east coast of Australia.

== Description ==
The grey butcherbird is a small grey, black and white bird with a weight of 90 grams (3.2 ounces), a body length between 27 and 30 cm (11 and 12 in) and a wing span expanding 37–43 cm (15–17 in). The grey butcherbird is smaller than the Pied Butcherbird (Cracticus nigrogularis).

The adult grey butcherbird has a black head, top and sides; and a white chin and throat through to the lower hindneck. The upperbody is mostly dark grey with streaks of narrow white bands that extends across the uppertail-coverts at the base of the tail. The uppertail is black with narrow white tips. The wings are grey with large areas of white and the underside of the wing is also white. The tip of the beak has a slight downwards hook.

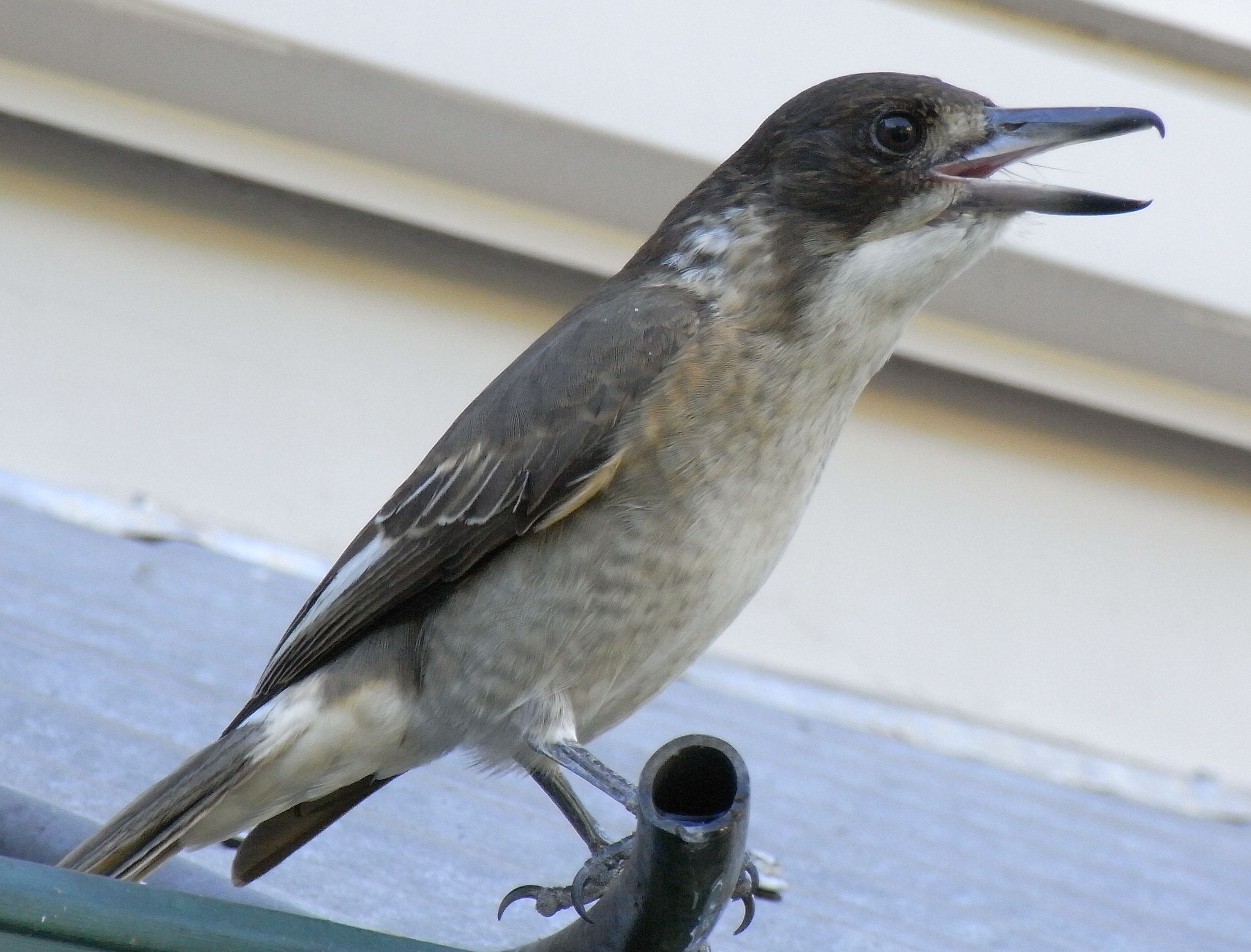
Juvenile

Both the male and female grey butcherbirds are similar in appearance, but the female is slightly smaller in size.

The juvenile is slightly different from the adult, as the juvenile does not have a black head, instead the head is a dark brown with fine streaks on the forehead and ear-covers and white loral spots that meet the eyes and bill, as well as having an off-white chin and throat. The upperbody is dark brown with streaks, and the uppertail-coverts are also a dark brown and have a brownish colour at the base of the uppertail. Juvenile's beaks are completely dark grey and often the hook at the tip of the beak is not obvious. The juvenile grey butcherbird is commonly mistaken for a small kingfisher.

== Song ==
All members of the territorial group contribute to the territorial song, a loud and rollicking song with both musical and harsh elements. The song can be sung by only one member, but more often it is sung in duet or as a group. Some duets are antiphonal where it is not obvious that two or more birds are singing. Most songs are sung with more than one phase and are sung antiphonally. These songs consist of different group members singing different phases sequentially, but sometimes there are some overlap. Some songs have been known to last up to 15 minutes. During this time, there is no vocal interaction with groups from other territories.

== Breeding and habitat ==
The grey butcherbird usually breed in single territorial pairs from July to January. Both sexes defend their territories and nest throughout the year. The female incubates the eggs while the nestlings and fledglings are fed by both parents. The nest is a shallow, bowl-shaped made from sticks and twigs. The nest is lined with grasses and other soft fibres. Nests are normally located within 10 m (33 ft) off the ground.

The grey butcherbird is found in a range of habitats, from eucalypt forests and woodlands, mallee and acacia shrublands, rainforests and riparian vegetation to urban areas and residential townships. The denser forests tend to be the favour for inland areas.

== Behaviour and diet ==
Grey butcherbirds feed on invertebrates, mainly insects; small vertebrates, including other small birds and their nestlings and lizards; and occasionally fruit and small seeds. They have a tendency to catch more food than they need and have a habit to store food in the fork of a branch to be consumed later. Uneaten food and over-sized food may also be impaled or stored for later.

Grey butcherbirds sit in branches and wait for prey. Prey is captured by the grey butcherbird sally-pouncing the prey on the ground. Small birds and insects can be captured in flight by using sally-striking. The grey butcherbird ambushes the foraging birds while they are on the ground, usually approaching and attacking them from behind. The grey butcherbird either feeds alone, in pairs or in small family groups.

== Gallery ==
Various images of butcherbirds in different contexts:

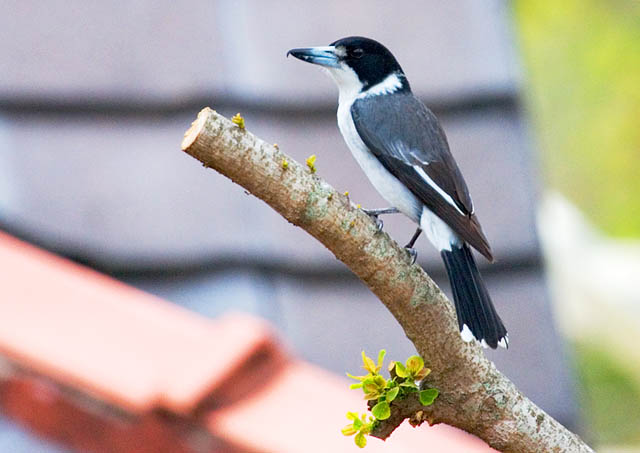

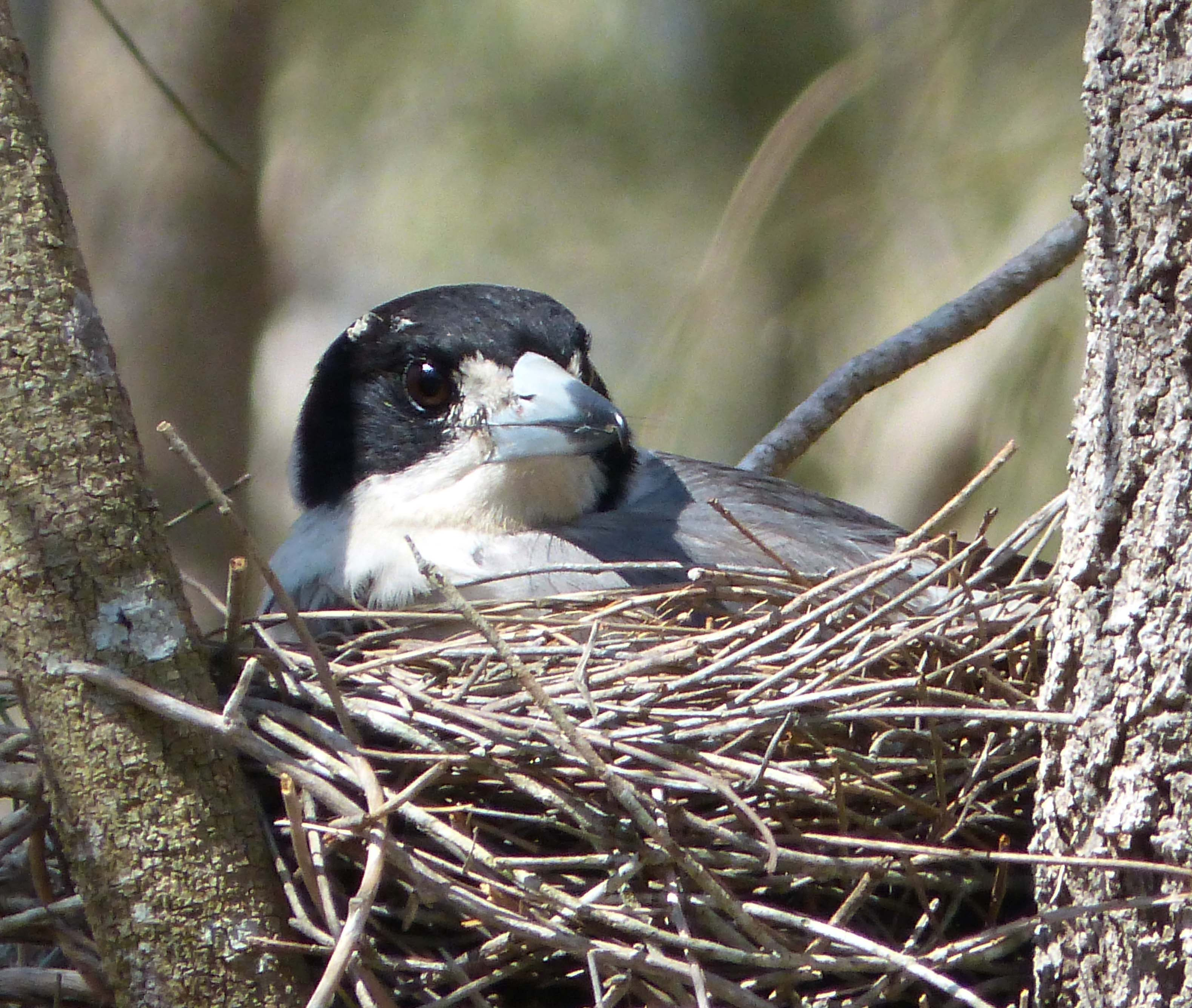

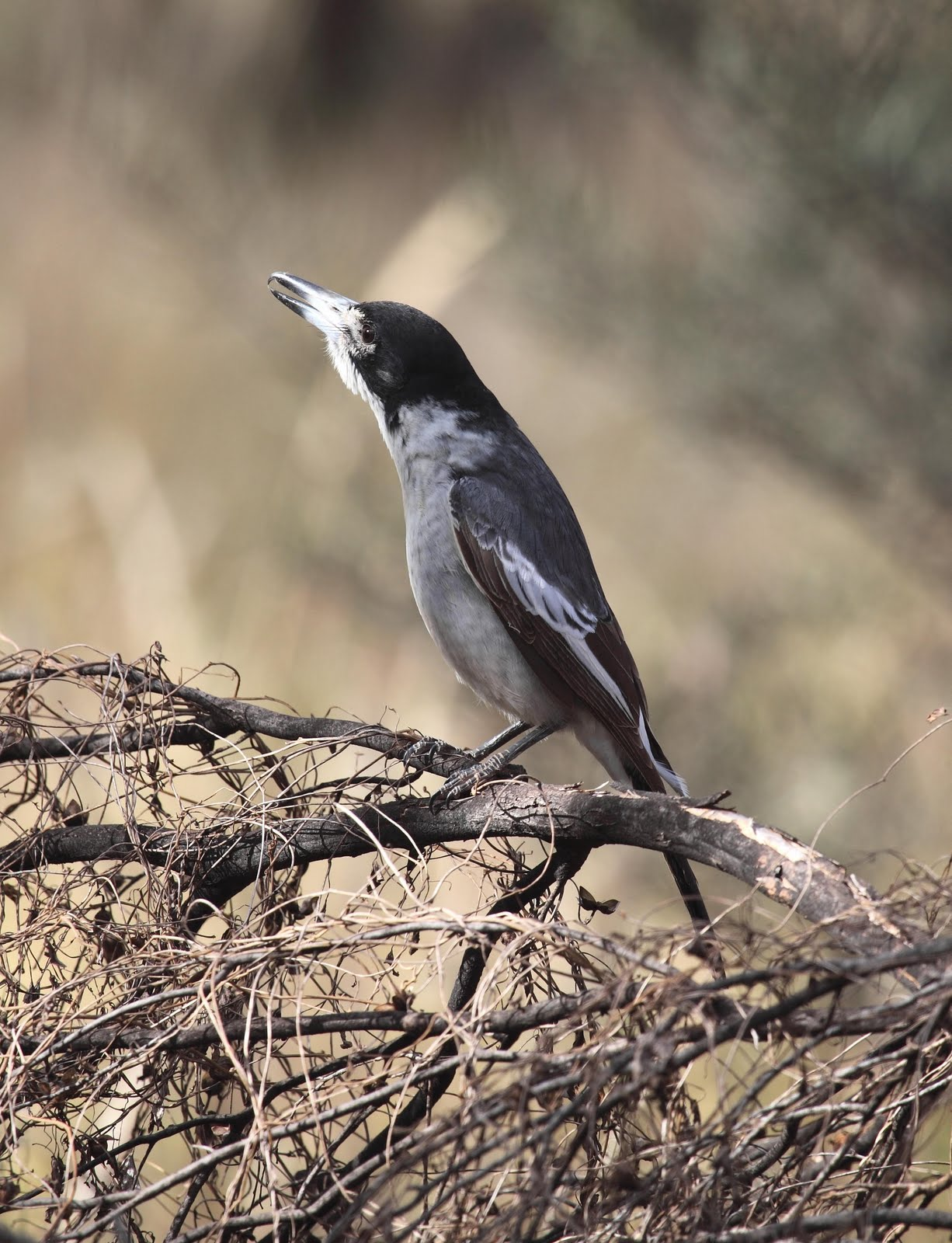
Cracticus torquatus singing

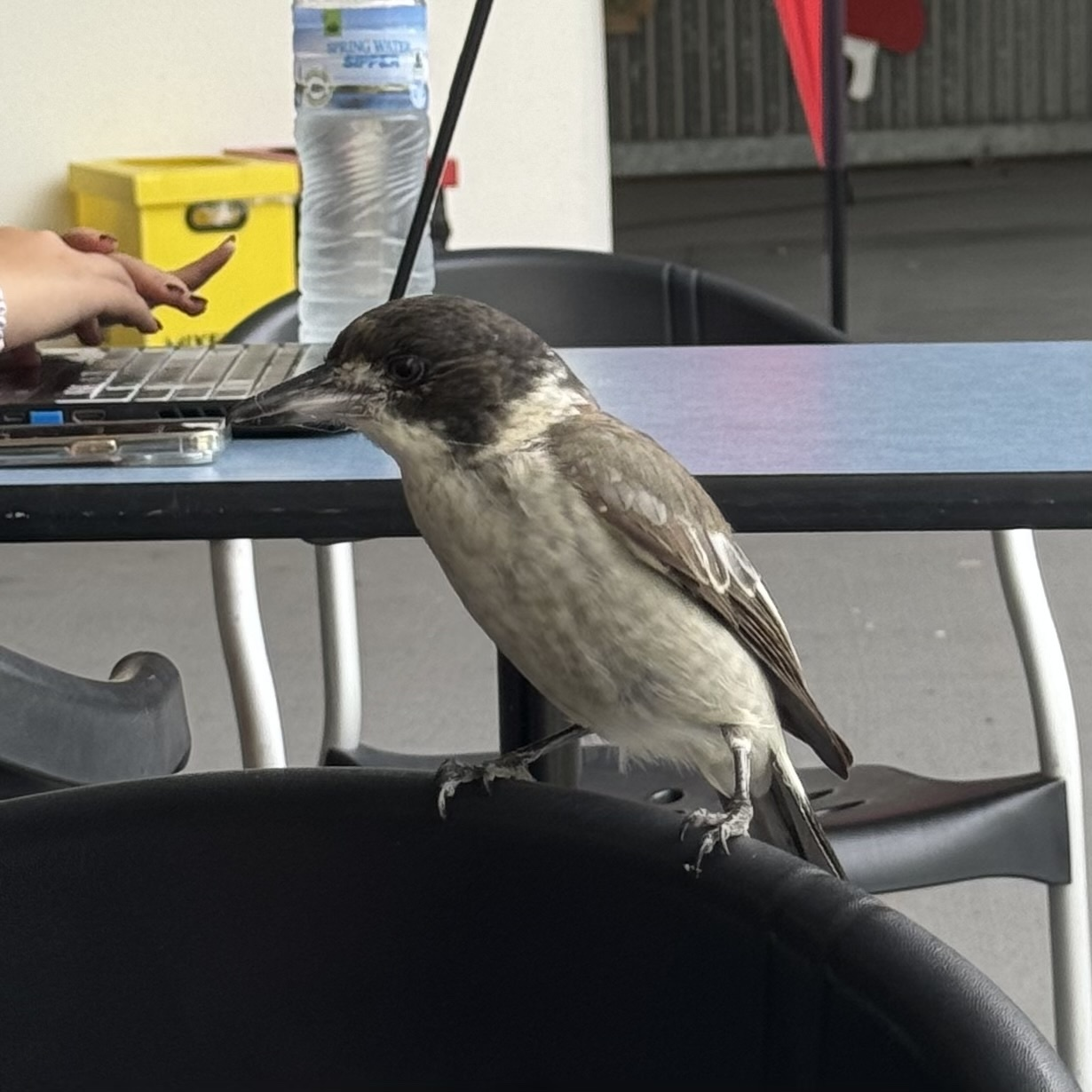
Juvenile
