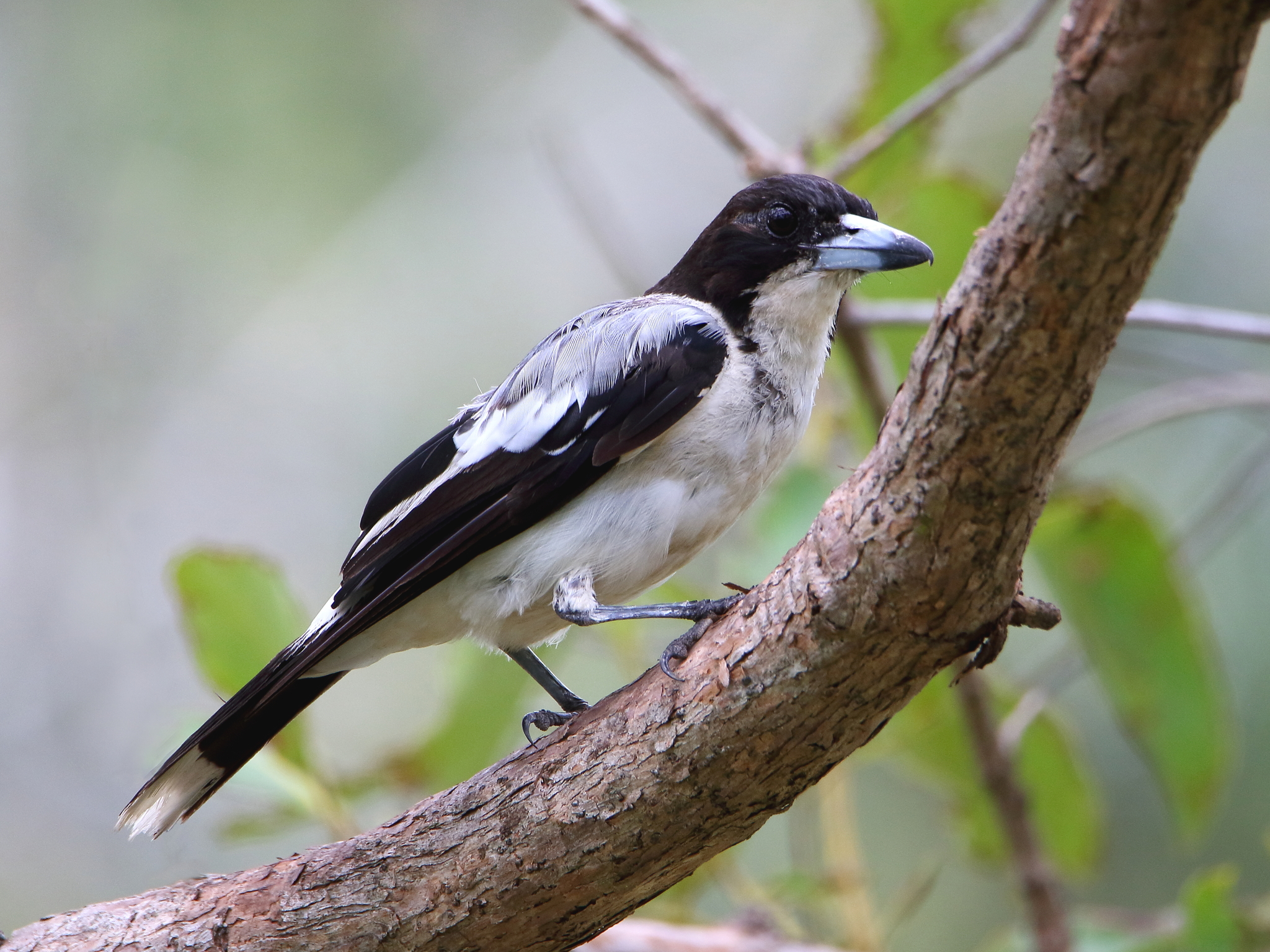

Conservation status
- Least Concern (IUCN 3.1)

Scientific classification
- Kingdom: Animalia
- Phylum: Chordata
- Class: Aves
- Order: Passeriformes
- Family: Artamidae
- Subfamily: Cracticinae
- Genus: Cracticus
- Species: C. argenteus

Binomial name
- Cracticus argenteus Gould, 1841

Synonyms
- Cracticus torquatus argenteus

= Silver-backed butcherbird =

Species of bird

The silver-backed butcherbird (Cracticus argenteus) is a small, shrike-like bird. It is almost identical to the grey butcherbird (C. torquatus) of which it considered by some authorities to be a subspecies, C. torquatus argenteus.

The species was first described by ornithologist John Gould in 1836 as Cracticus argenteus.

== Description ==
The silver-backed butcherbird looks similar to the Grey butcherbird, except its back is lighter and silvery. This species is snappy and fearless, diving at humans and dogs near the nest. It may attack other birds like the spangled drongo or common koel.

== Diet ==
It is a part-time predator but insects are also taken. It feeds on small lizards such as skinks and mice along with small birds that it snares and plucks out of the sky.
