= Tagula butcherbird =

Conservation status
- Near Threatened (IUCN 3.1)

Scientific classification
- Kingdom: Animalia
- Phylum: Chordata
- Class: Aves
- Order: Passeriformes
- Family: Artamidae
- Subfamily: Cracticinae
- Genus: Cracticus
- Species: C. louisiadensis

Binomial name
- Cracticus louisiadensis Tristram, 1889

Species of bird

The Tagula butcherbird (Cracticus louisiadensis) is a species of bird in the family Artamidae. It is endemic to the lowland forests of Tagula Island in Papua New Guinea. It occupies less than 800km^{2} and has an estimated population of 11,500 to 23,000 individuals.

== Taxonomy ==
The species was first described by Henry Baker Tristram in 1889. It is monotypic, with no recognized subspecies.

== Description ==
The bird is described as large.

The plumage is mainly black, with white patches on the shoulder, wing, and tail.
