= John Albert Leach =

Australian ornithologist

John Albert Leach (19 March 1870 – 3 October 1929) was an ornithologist, teacher and headmaster in the state of Victoria, Australia.

Leach was born in Ballarat, Victoria and educated at Creswick Grammar School (where he was dux), Melbourne Training College (1890) and the University of Melbourne, where he graduated B.Sc. in 1904, M.Sc. in 1906 and in 1912 obtained his doctorate for research in ornithology.

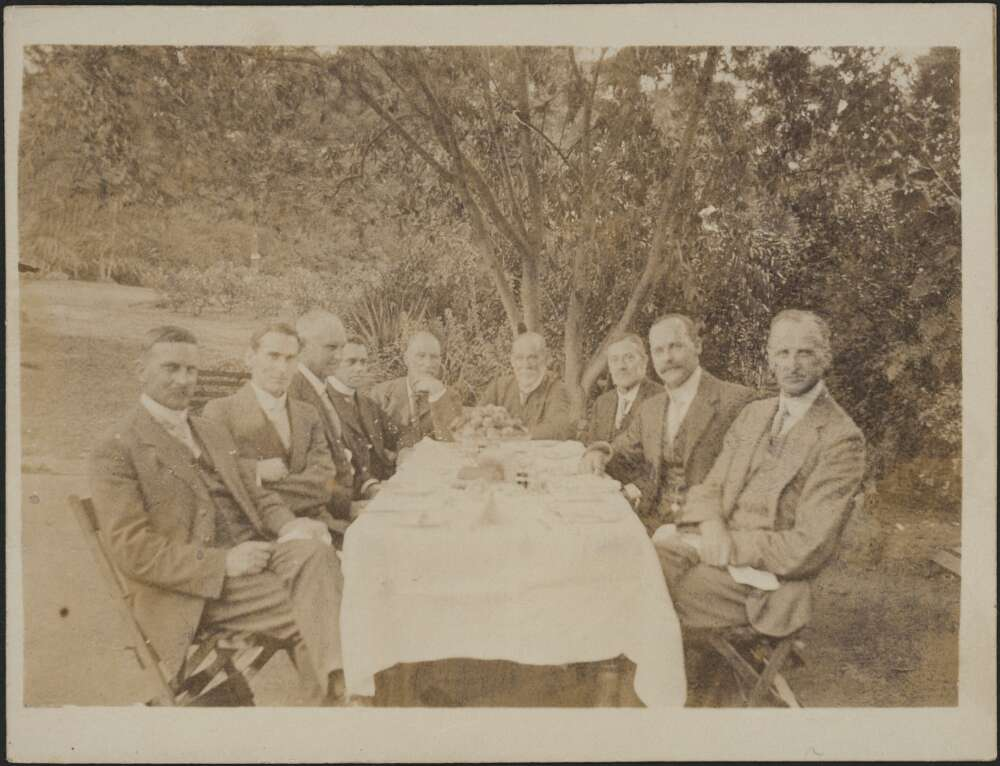
Group portrait of Dr J. Leach, L. Chandler, C. McLennan, C. Barrett, A.J. Campbell, D. Le Souef, T. Tregallas, Z. Gray, Gregory Mathews

Leach was a regular writer and broadcaster on natural history subjects and introduced it into the school curriculum. He was President of the Royal Australasian Ornithologists Union (RAOU) 1922-1924 and Editor of its journal The Emu 1914-1924 and 1928–1929. He was a member of the British Ornithologists Union and a corresponding fellow of the American Ornithologists Union. Leach was also member of the Field Naturalists Club of Victoria. He was instrumental in founding the Gould League of Bird Lovers in 1909 with Jessie McMichael. He is best known as the author of An Australian Bird Book, the first edition of which was published in 1911, and of Australian Nature Studies in 1922. He was also part-authored a series of Federal Geography books, and worked on the Official Checklist of the Birds of Australia second and revised edition, published by the RAOU in September 1926.

Leach had been preparing two books before his death, one of these was a collection of weekly radio broadcasts he made on 3LO in the mid-1920s. He died of pericarditis and pleurisy in Richmond and was survived by his wife, son and one daughter. Another daughter had pre-deceased him.

Among his contributions to ornithology was the relationship between the Australian magpie, butcherbirds and currawongs in the family Cracticidae, now sunk as a subfamily into Artamidae.

== General references ==
- Robin, Libby. (2001). The Flight of the Emu: a hundred years of Australian ornithology 1901-2001. Carlton, Vic. Melbourne University Press. ISBN 0-522-84987-3
- Serle, Percival (1949). "Leach, John Albert". Dictionary of Australian Biography. Sydney: Angus & Robertson.
- Tess Kloot, 'Leach, John Albert (1870 – 1929)', Australian Dictionary of Biography, Volume 10, MUP, 1986, pp. 32–33.
- Leach, John Albert (1870 – 1929) at Bright Sparcs (Melbourne University)
