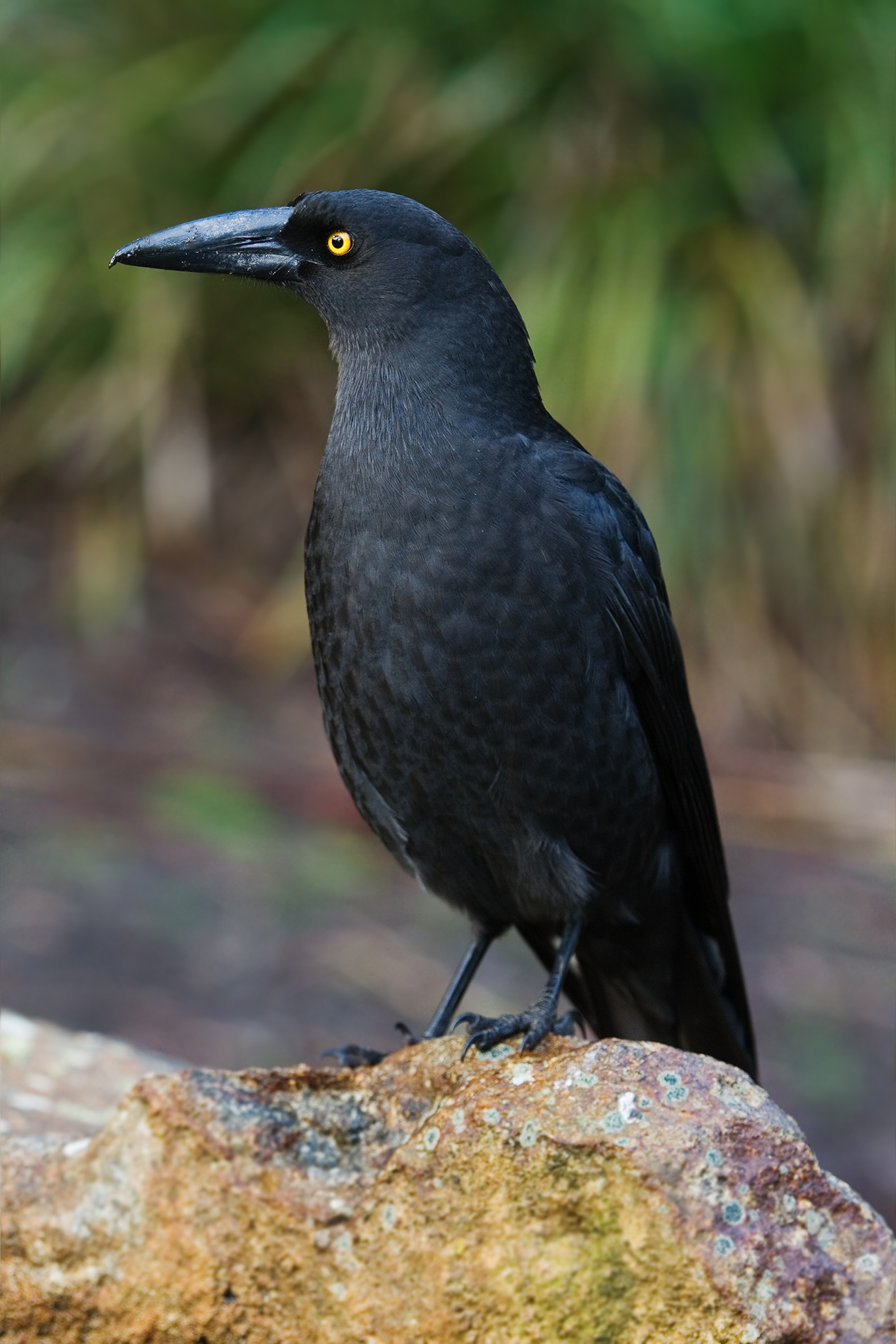
- Black currawong, Fortescue Bay, Tasman Peninsula

Scientific classification
- Kingdom: Animalia
- Phylum: Chordata
- Class: Aves
- Order: Passeriformes
- Family: Artamidae
- Subfamily: Cracticinae
- Genus: Strepera; Lesson, 1831

Type species
- Coracias strepera Latham, 1790

Species
- Strepera graculina; Strepera versicolor; Strepera fuliginosa

= Currawong =

Genus of birds

Currawongs are three species of medium-sized passerine birds belonging to the genus Strepera in the family Artamidae native to Australia. These are the grey currawong (Strepera versicolor), pied currawong (S. graculina), and black currawong (S. fuliginosa). The common name comes from the call of the familiar pied currawong of eastern Australia and is onomatopoeic. They were formerly known as crow-shrikes or bell-magpies. Despite their resemblance to crows and ravens, they are only distantly related to the Corvidae, instead belonging to an Afro-Asian radiation of birds of superfamily Malaconotoidea.

Currawongs are not as terrestrial as the Australian magpie and have shorter legs. They are omnivorous, foraging in foliage, on tree trunks and limbs, and on the ground, taking insects and larvae (often dug out from under the bark of trees), fruit, and the nestlings of other birds.

== Taxonomy and evolution ==
Ornithologist Richard Bowdler Sharpe held that currawongs were more closely related to crows and ravens than the Australian magpie and butcherbirds, and duly placed them in the Corvidae. A review of the family Cracticidae by ornithologist John Albert Leach in 1914, during which he had studied their musculature, found that all three genera were closely related. Ornithologists Charles Sibley and Jon Ahlquist recognised the close relationship between the woodswallows and the butcherbirds and relatives in 1985, and combined them into a Cracticini clade, which later became the family Artamidae in the official Australian checklist in 2008. The International Ornithologists' Union has maintained the two clades as separate families, hence currawongs are listed along with butcherbirds, magpie and Peltops.

The family Cracticidae has its greatest diversity in Australia, which suggests that the radiation of its insectivorous and scavenger members to occupy various niches took place there. The butcherbirds became predators of small animals, much like the northern hemisphere shrikes, while the Australian magpie became a predominantly ground-hunting omnivore, with the currawongs generally hunting in both living and fallen trees, scavenging and hunting insects and small vertebrates, and occupying in Australia the niche of many Eurasian corvids.

A 2013 genetic analysis by Anna Kearns and colleagues confirmed the currawongs are a monophyletic group, with some indication that the black currawong lineage diverged from a common ancestor of the grey and pied currawongs (though sampling was limited and not the focus of the study). The common ancestor of butcherbirds and currawongs diverged from peltops between 28.3 and 16.9 million years ago, which followed the expansion of open habitat in Australia 30 to 25 million years ago. The ancestors of currawongs then diverged from the ancestor of butcherbirds and magpie between 17.3 and 9.8 million years ago.

Currawongs and indeed all members of the broader Artamidae are part of a larger group of African shrike-like birds including bushshrikes (Malaconotidae), helmetshrikes (Prionopidae), ioras (Aegithinidae), and vangas (Vangidae), which were defined as the superfamily Malaconotoidea by Cacraft and colleagues in 2004. They are thus only distantly related to crows and ravens, which are in a separate superfamily Corvoidea.

=== Species and races ===
Although there are several distinct forms, the number of species has varied between two and seven, with three currently recognised. (In 1870 the Gardens of the Zoological Society of London had a living specimen of each of the three species.) Several subspecies of the grey currawong are fairly distinctive and described on that species page.

Image	Common name	Scientific name	Subspecies	Distribution
	Black currawong, black jay	S. fuliginosa	S. fuliginosa colei – King Island black currawong; S. fuliginosa parvior – Flinders Island black currawong	Tasmania
	Pied currawong	S. graculina	S. graculina graculina; S. graculina ashbyi – western Victorian pied currawong; S. graculina crissalis – Lord Howe currawong; S. graculina magnirostris; S. graculina robinsoni; S. graculina nebulosa	East Australia
	Grey currawong	S. versicolor	S. versicolor versicolor – grey currawong; S. versicolor intermedia – brown currawong; S. versicolor plumbea – grey currawong (WA); S. versicolor halmaturina – grey currawong (Kangaroo Island); S. versicolor arguta – clinking currawong or black magpie; S. versicolor melanoptera – black-winged currawong	Southern Australia, Tasmania

=== Etymology ===
The term currawong itself is derived from the call of the pied currawong. However, the exact origin of term is unclear; the most likely antecedent is the word garrawaŋ from the local Jagera language from the Brisbane region, although the Dharug word gurawaruŋ from the Sydney basin is a possibility. Yungang as well as kurrawang and kurrawah are names from the Tharawal people of the Illawarra region.

== Description ==
The three currawong species are sombre-plumaged dark grey or black birds with large bills. They resemble crows and ravens, although are slimmer in build with longer tails, booted tarsi and white pages on their wings and tails. Their flight is undulating. Male birds have longer bills than females. The reason for this is unknown but suggests differentiation in feeding technique.

The true currawongs are a little larger than the Australian magpie, smaller than the ravens (except possibly the little raven, which is only slightly larger on average), but broadly similar in appearance. They are easily distinguished by their yellow eyes, in contrast to the red eyes of a magpie and white eyes of Australian crows and ravens. Currawongs are also characterised by the hooked tips of their long, sharply pointed beaks.

== Distribution and habitat ==
Currawongs are protected in NSW under the National Parks and Wildlife Act 1974.

== Behaviour ==
Currawongs are dominant birds that can drive off other species, especially when settling around an area used or inhabited by people. They have been known to migrate to towns and cities during the winter. Birds congregate in loose flocks.

The female builds the nest and incubates the young alone, although both parents feed them. The nests are somewhat flimsy for birds their size.

Currawongs can be friendly to humans and may form long lasting relationships. As of September 2021, a currawong had been visiting the same property in the Barrington Tops area of New South Wales for over eighteen years.
