= Crow =

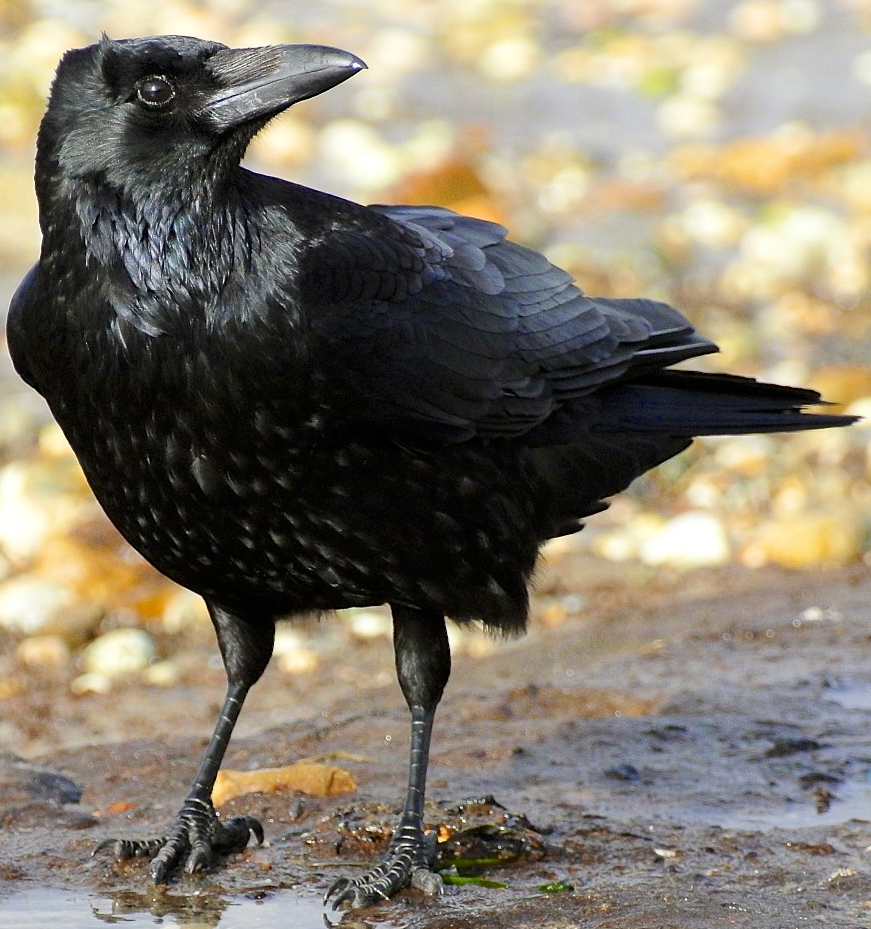
A carrion crow scavenging on a beach in Dorset, England

Calls of a carrion crow

A flock of crows

A crow is a bird of the genus Corvus, or more broadly, a synonym for all of Corvus. The word "crow" is used as part of the common name of many species. The related term "raven" is not linked scientifically to any certain trait but is rather a general grouping for larger-sized species of Corvus. The collective name for a group of crows is a "murder".

== Behavior and intelligence ==
Crows are highly intelligent birds known for problem solving, tool use, and social behavior. Studies have shown that crows create and use tools, recognize and remember individual human faces, and share information with other crows about potential threats. Crows also live in social groups and communicate with one another using a variety of vocalizations.

== Species ==
- Corvus (C.) albus – Pied crow (Central African coasts to Southern Africa)
- C. bennetti – Little crow (Australia)
- C. brachyrhynchos – American crow (United States, southern Canada, northern Mexico)
- C. capensis – Cape crow or Cape rook (East and Southern Africa)
- C. celebensis – Sulawesi crow (Sulawesi, Indonesia)
- C. cornix – Hooded crow (Northern and Eastern Europe, North Africa and Middle East)
- C. corone – Carrion crow (Europe and East Asia)
- C. culminatus – Indian jungle crow (South Asia)
- C. edithae – Somali crow or dwarf raven (East Africa)
- C. enca – Sunda crow (Malaysia, Borneo, Indonesia)
- C. florensis – Flores crow (Flores Island)
- C. fuscicapillus – Brown-headed crow (New Guinea)
- C. hawaiiensis (formerly C. tropicus) – Hawaiian crow (Hawaii)
- C. imparatus – Tamaulipas crow (northeastern Mexico and southern Texas)
- C. insularis – Bismarck crow (Bismarck Archipelago, Papua New Guinea)
- C. jamaicensis – Jamaican crow (Jamaica)
- C. kubaryi – Mariana crow or aga (Guam and Rota, Marianas)
- C. leucognaphalus – White-necked crow (Haiti, Dominican Republic, Puerto Rico)
- C. levaillantii – Eastern jungle crow (India, Burma)
- C. macrorhynchos – Large-billed crow (East Asia)
- C. meeki – Bougainville crow or Solomon Islands crow (Papua New Guinea, Northern Solomon Islands)
- C. minutus – Cuban palm crow (Cuba)
- C. moneduloides – New Caledonian crow (New Caledonia, Loyalty Islands)
- C. nasicus – Cuban crow (Cuba, Isla de la Juventud, Grand Caicos Island)
- C. orru – Torresian crow or Australian crow (Australia, New Guinea and nearby islands)
- C. ossifragus – Fish crow (southeastern coastal United States)
- C. palmarum – Hispaniolan palm crow (Hispaniola (Haiti and the Dominican Republic)
- C. philippinus – Philippine jungle crow (Philippines)
- C. pusillus – Palawan crow (Philippines)
- C. samarensis – Samar crow (Philippines)
- C. sierramadrensis – Sierra Madre crow (Philippines)
- C. sinaloae – Sinaloa crow (Pacific Coast from Sonora to Colima)
- C. splendens – House crow or Indian house crow (South Asia, Middle East, East Africa)
- C. torquatus – Collared crow (eastern China south into Vietnam)
- C. torques – White-collared crow (Central Africa; treated by some older sources as a separate species, but usually considered a subspecies of C. albus in modern taxonomy)
- C. tristis – Grey crow or Bare-faced crow (New Guinea and neighboring islands)
- C. typicus – Piping crow or Celebes pied crow (Sulawesi, Muna, Butung)
- C. unicolor – Banggai crow (Banggai Island)
- C. validus – Long-billed crow (Northern Moluccas)
- C. violaceus – Violet crow (Seram, Indonesia)
- C. woodfordi – White-billed crow or Solomon Islands crow (Solomon Islands)

== See also ==
- Jackdaw
- Raven
- Rook
