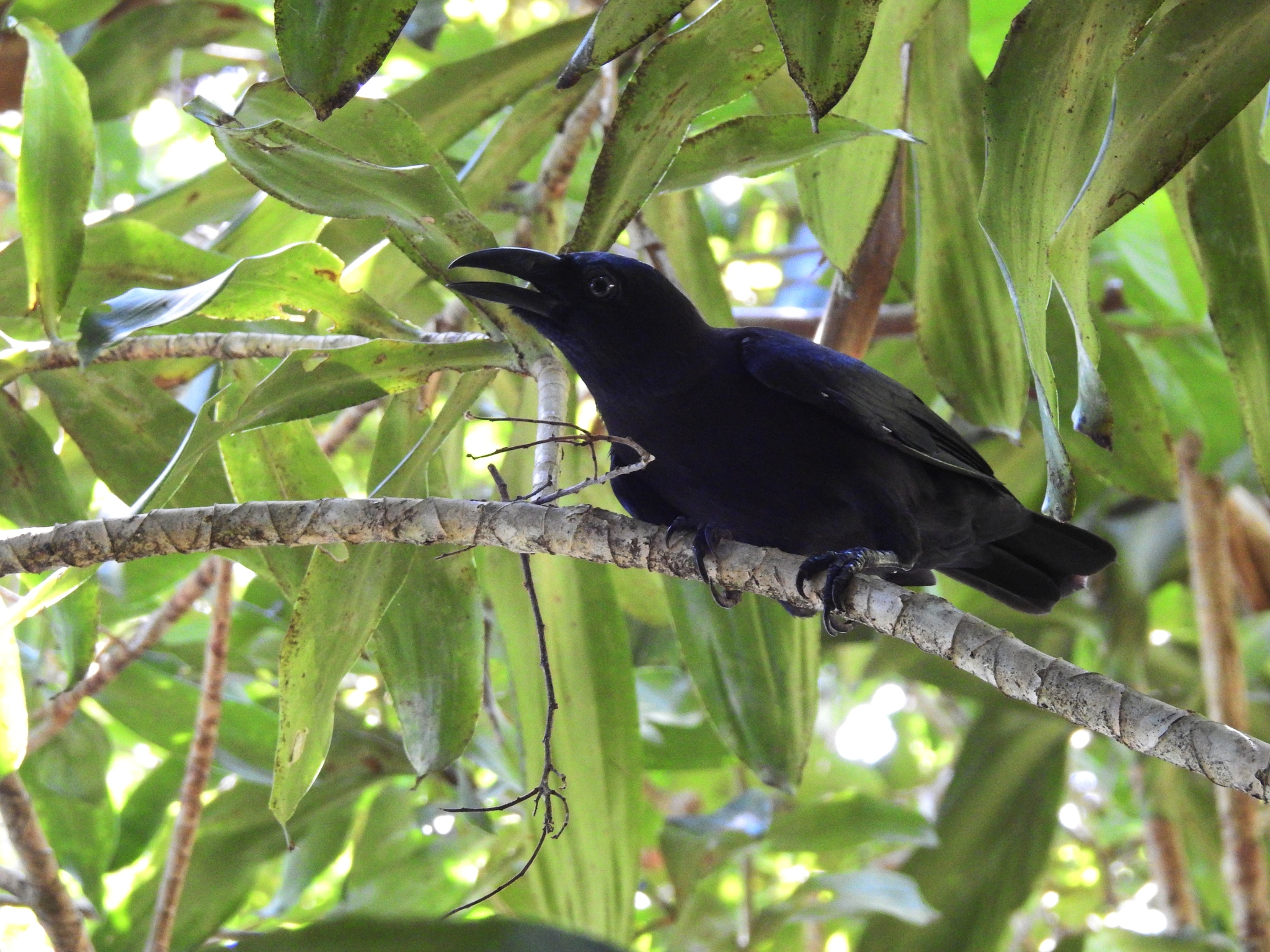
- C. unicolor in Sulawesi Tengah, Indonesia

Conservation status
- Critically Endangered (IUCN 3.1)

Scientific classification
- Kingdom: Animalia
- Phylum: Chordata
- Class: Aves
- Order: Passeriformes
- Family: Corvidae
- Genus: Corvus
- Species: C. unicolor

Binomial name
- Corvus unicolor (Rothschild & Hartert, 1900)

Synonyms
- Corvus enca unicolor Gazzola unicolor

= Banggai crow =

Species of bird

The Banggai crow (Corvus unicolor), known as kuuyak in the Banggai language, is a member of the crow family from Banggai regency in the province of Central Sulawesi in Indonesia. It is listed as critically endangered by IUCN. It was feared extinct, but was finally rediscovered during surveys on Peleng Island off the southeast coast of Sulawesi by Indonesian ornithologist Mochamad Indrawan in 2007 and 2008.

It was sometimes considered a subspecies of the slender-billed crow, but it is actually rather distinct from this bird, resembling an entirely black piping crow overall. The Banggai crow is a small crow, some 39 cm (15 in) long and completely black with a pale iris and a short tail.

For more than a century, it was known from only two specimens taken from an unknown island in the Banggai Archipelago - probably in 1884/1885. Visits to the archipelago in 1991 and 1996 yielded no unequivocal records of the species, leading some to believe it was extinct. During a survey conducted between 2007 and 2008 and partially financed by the Zoological Society for the Conservation of Species and Populations (Germany), it was repeatedly seen on Peleng Island and Indonesian ornithologist Mochamad Indrawan caught and photographed two individuals. The validity of the crows on Peleng was not recognized by BirdLife International in its 2009 Red List. Confirmation of the identity based on two specimens from Peleng was made by Pamela C. Rasmussen of the American Museum of Natural History in October 2009.

The total population is estimated at 500 mature individuals, living in mountain forest at altitudes above 500 m (1,600 ft). The decline of the Banggai crow is thought to be primarily due to habitat loss and degradation through agriculture and extraction.

This bird remained a complete enigma for a long time. Listed as Vulnerable in the 1994 IUCN Red List, it was changed to Endangered in 2000. In 2006, the status was considered as Possibly Extinct. This proved to be incorrect and the status was corrected to Critically Endangered in the 2007 Red List.
