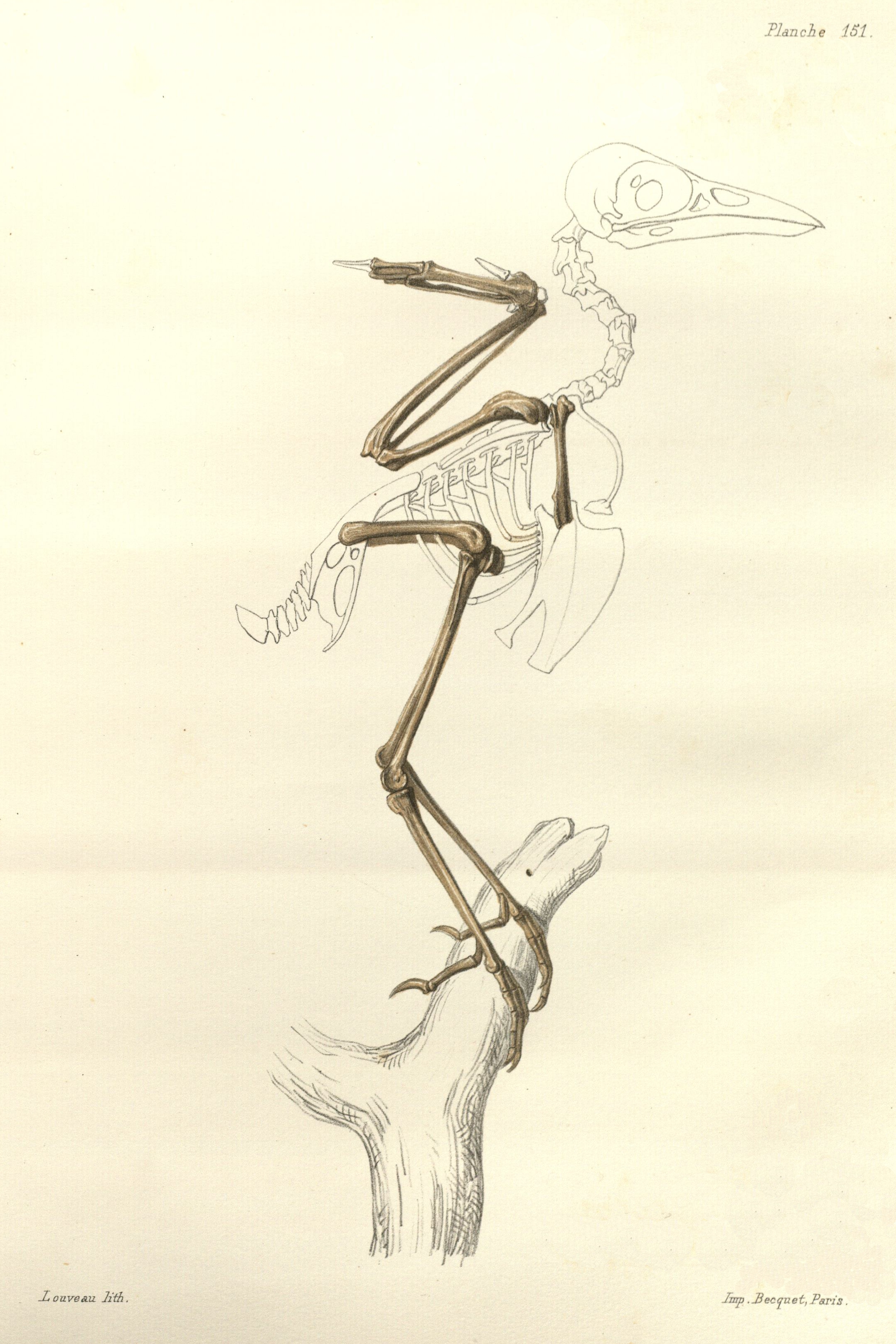
- 1871 diagram of the known elements

Scientific classification
- Kingdom: Animalia
- Phylum: Chordata
- Class: Aves
- Order: Passeriformes
- Family: Corvidae
- Genus: †Miocorvus; Lambrecht, 1933
- Species: †M. larteti

Binomial name
- †Miocorvus larteti (A. Milne-Edwards, 1871)

Synonyms
- Corvus larteti A. Milne-Edwards, 1871

= Miocorvus =

Extinct genus of birds

Miocorvus larteti is an extinct species of corvid bird from the Miocene of Europe. It is the only species in the genus Miocorvus.

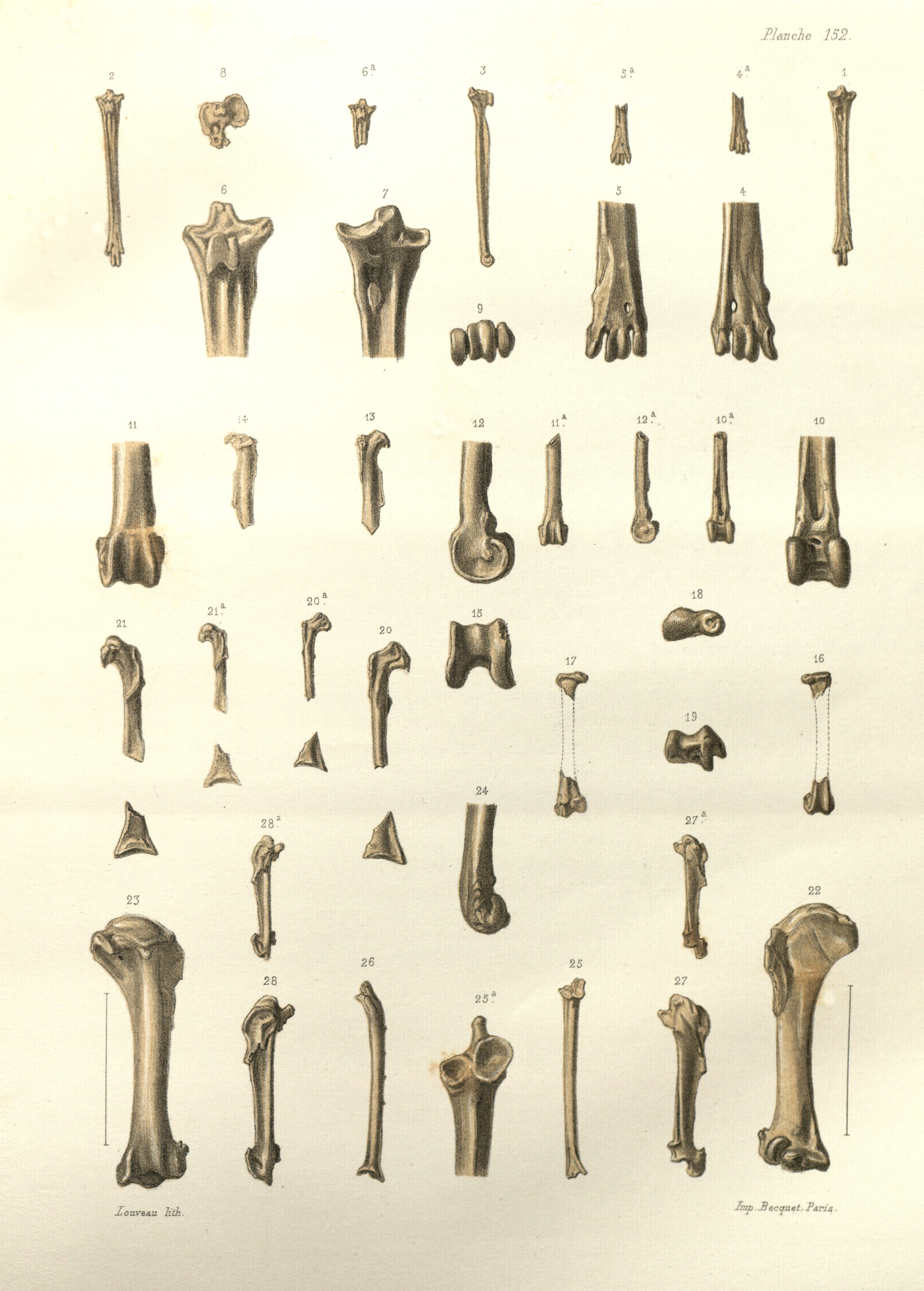
Fossils

== Distribution ==
Miocorvus mostly lived in trees in dense huge forests, such as coniferous forests, mostly feeding on any meal that was available. Miocorvus may have been adapted to being an omnivore.

== Diet ==
The diet of Miocorvus may have consisted of fruit, and invertebrates such as snails, slugs and presumably eggs of other birds in nests. It may have also eaten dead animal matter, such as carrion leftovers by other animals.

== Characteristics ==
Miocorvus was a member of the Corvid family, presumably being around the same size as the modern crow, with many distinct features than the modern day crow and presumably having a different beak.
