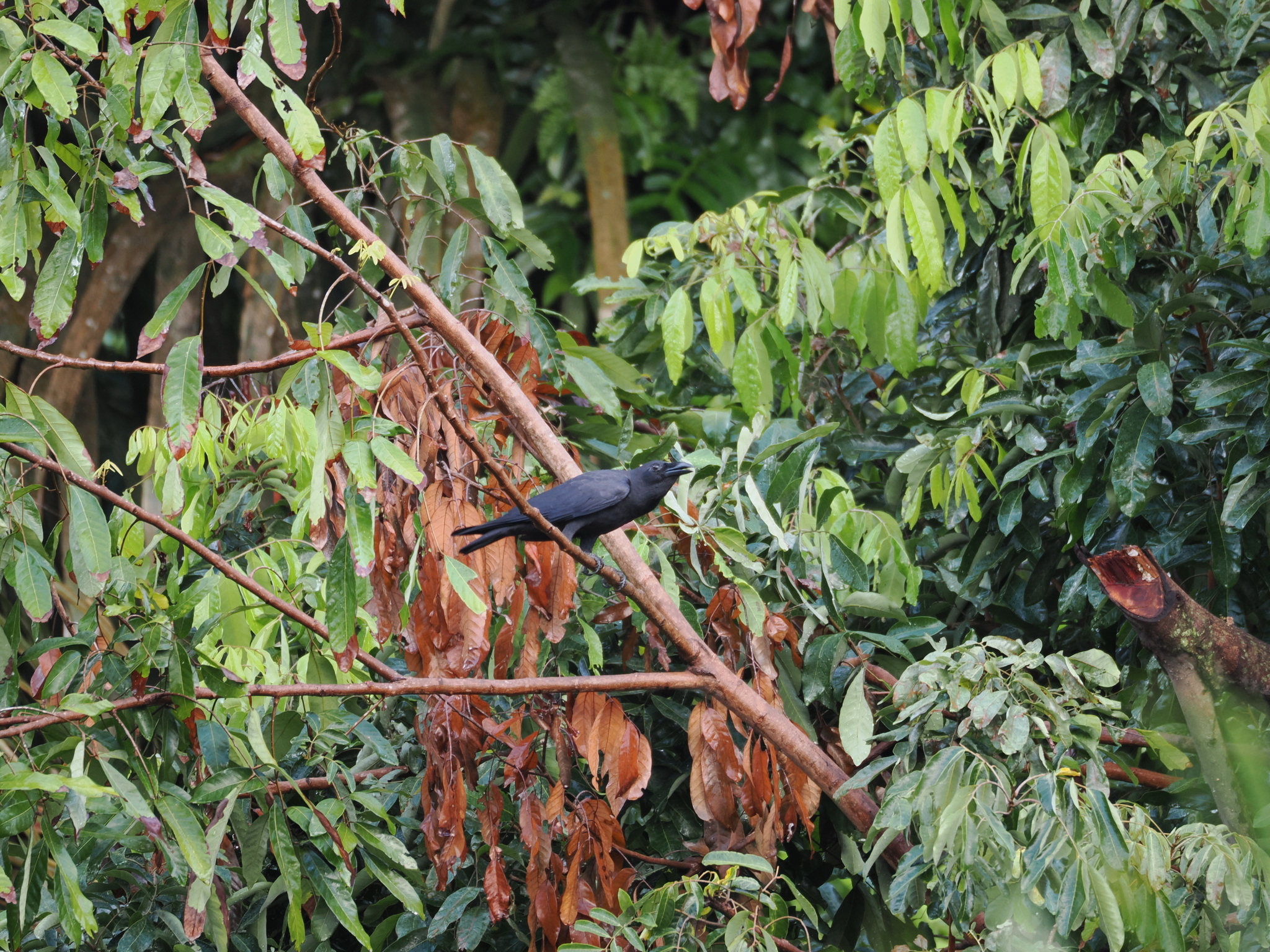

Scientific classification
- Kingdom: Animalia
- Phylum: Chordata
- Class: Aves
- Order: Passeriformes
- Family: Corvidae
- Genus: Corvus
- Species: C. celebensis

Binomial name
- Corvus celebensis Stresemann, 1936

Synonyms
- Corvus enca celebensis (protonym)

= Sulawesi crow =

Species of bird

The Sulawesi crow (Corvus celebensis) is a passerine bird in the crow family Corvidae that is endemic to the Indonesian island of Sulawesi. It was formerly considered as conspecific with the Sunda crow with the combined taxa known as the slender-billed crow.

== Taxonomy ==
The Sulawesi crow was formally described in 1936 by the German ornithologist Erwin Stresemann based on a specimen collected near the village of Rurukan in northern Celebes (now Sulawesi). He considered the specimen to be a subspecies of the Sunda crow and coined the trinomial name Corvus enca celebensis. It is now separated as a distinct species based on vocal and genetic differences. With the split the name of Corvus enca was changed from "slender-billed crow" to "Sunda crow".

Two subspecies are recognised:

- Corvus celebensis celebensis Stresemann, 1936 – Sulawesi and satellites
- Corvus celebensis mangoli Vaurie, 1958 – Sula Islands (east of Sulawesi)
