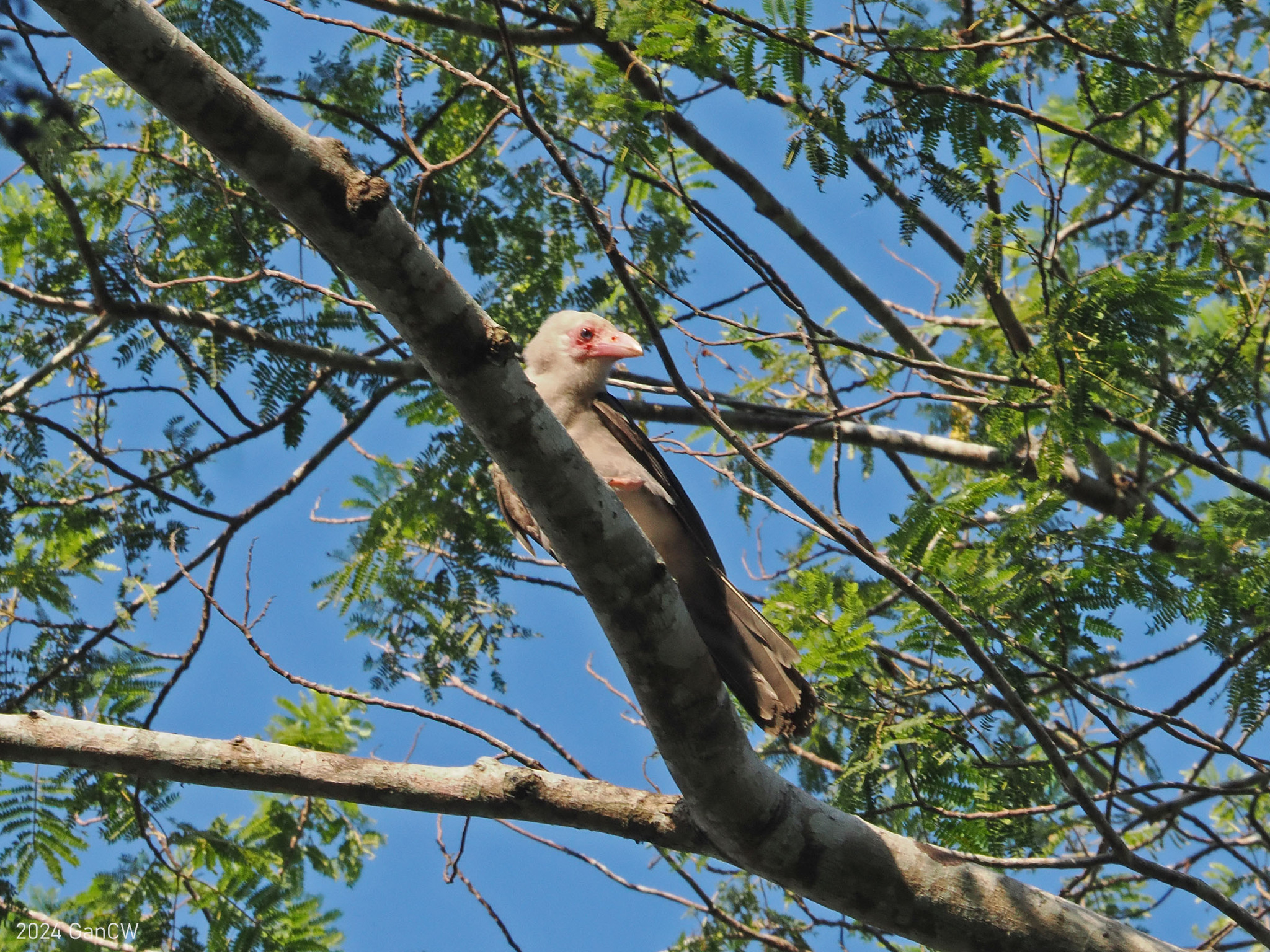

Conservation status
- Least Concern (IUCN 3.1)

Scientific classification
- Kingdom: Animalia
- Phylum: Chordata
- Class: Aves
- Order: Passeriformes
- Family: Corvidae
- Genus: Corvus
- Species: C. tristis

Binomial name
- Corvus tristis Lesson & Garnot, 1827
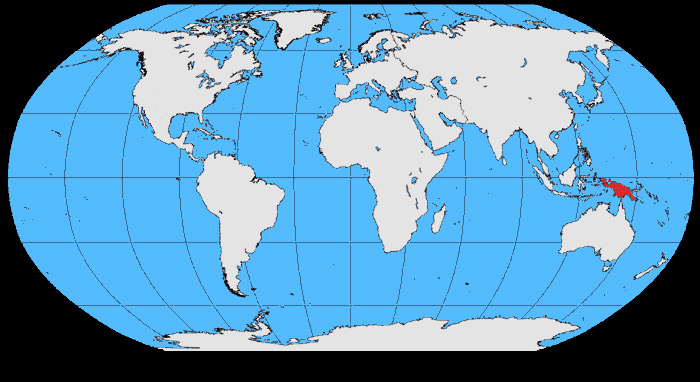
- Distribution map

Synonyms
- Corvus senex

= Grey crow =

Species of bird

The gray crow (Corvus tristis), formerly known as the bare-faced crow, is about the same size (42–45 cm or 17–18 in in length) as the Eurasian carrion crow (Corvus corone) but has somewhat different proportions and quite atypical feather pigmentation during the juvenile phase for a member of this genus.

The tail feathers are relatively long and graduated and the legs are relatively short. The overall colouring of the adult bird is black with randomly bleached wing and tail feathers. A large region around the eye is quite bare of feathering and shows pinkish-white skin with the eyes a bluish-white. The bill is unusual too in being very variable, bluish on upper mandible and pinkish-white on the lower in some specimens, while on others the whole bill is pinkish white with a darker tip. The forward pointing nasal bristles so often prominent in other Corvus species are very reduced also.

The juvenile bird by comparison has remarkably pale plumage being light brown to cream, the wings, tail and primaries showing blackish-brown and fawn and the head and underparts often almost white.

The species occurs all over the huge island of New Guinea and associated offshore islands in both primary and secondary forest in both lowland and hill forest up to 1,350 m (4,430 ft).

Feeding is both on the ground and in trees taking a very wide range of items. Fruit seems to be very important making up a large percentage of the intake though small animals such as frogs and aquatic insect larvae are taken from shallow water on sand or shingle beds in rivers. When foraging through the trees the birds keep loose, noisy contact with each other and usually number between 4–8 individuals.

The voice is described as a weak sounding 'ka' or a whining 'caw' with other hoarse sounding notes added when excited.
