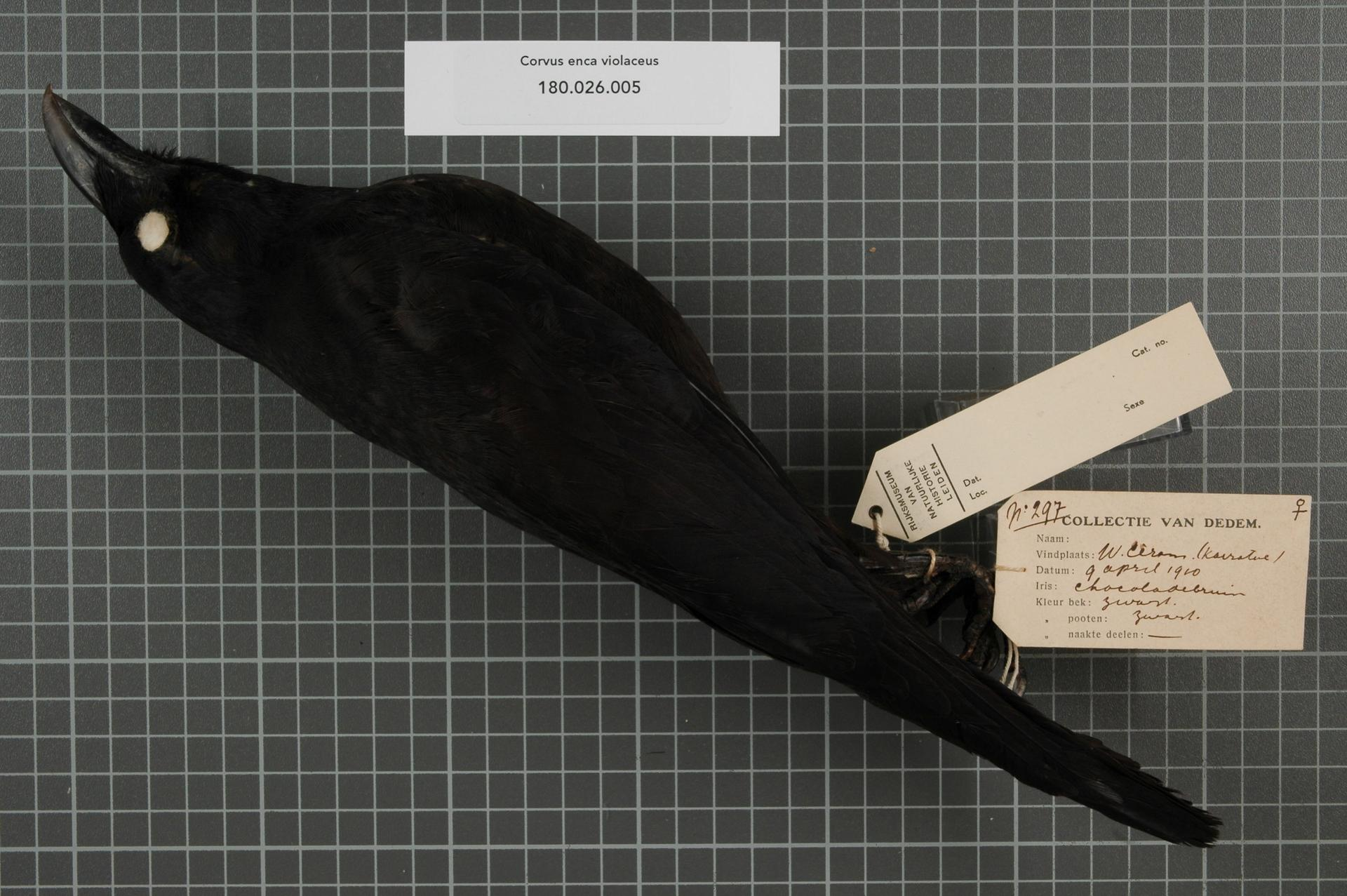

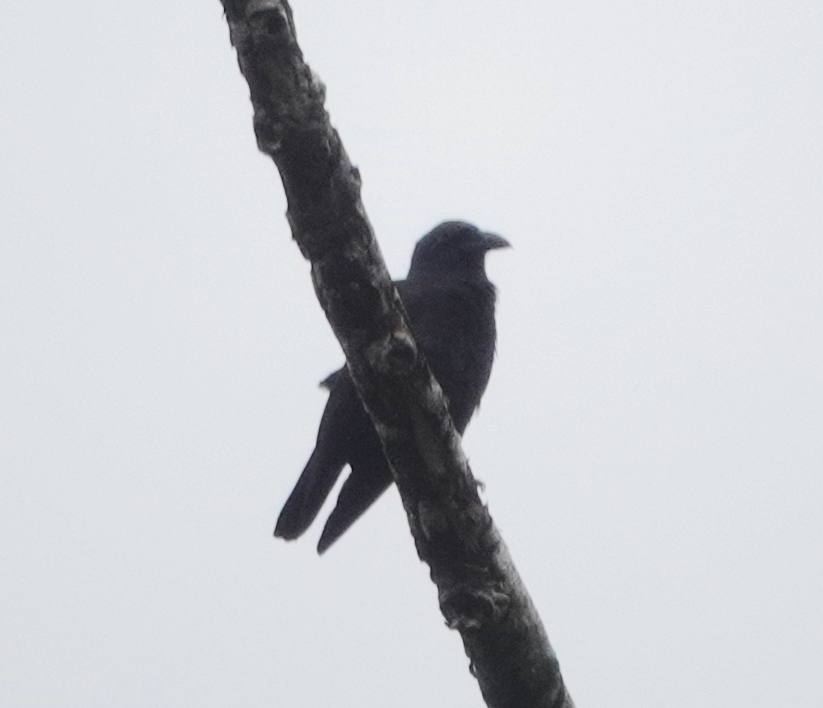

Conservation status
- Least Concern (IUCN 3.1)

Scientific classification
- Kingdom: Animalia
- Phylum: Chordata
- Class: Aves
- Order: Passeriformes
- Family: Corvidae
- Genus: Corvus
- Species: C. violaceus

Binomial name
- Corvus violaceus Bonaparte, 1850

= Violet crow =

Species of bird

The violet crow (Corvus violaceus) is a species of the crow family, Corvidae, native to Seram, an island in Indonesia. It was long considered a subspecies of the slender-billed crow but has been shown to be divergent genetically. Violet crows have a dark black head and slightly blue black body and have a slightly shorter bill than most other crow species.

== Habitat ==
Violet crows primarily inhabit forests and plantations, although they move to more open areas and farmland to feed.
