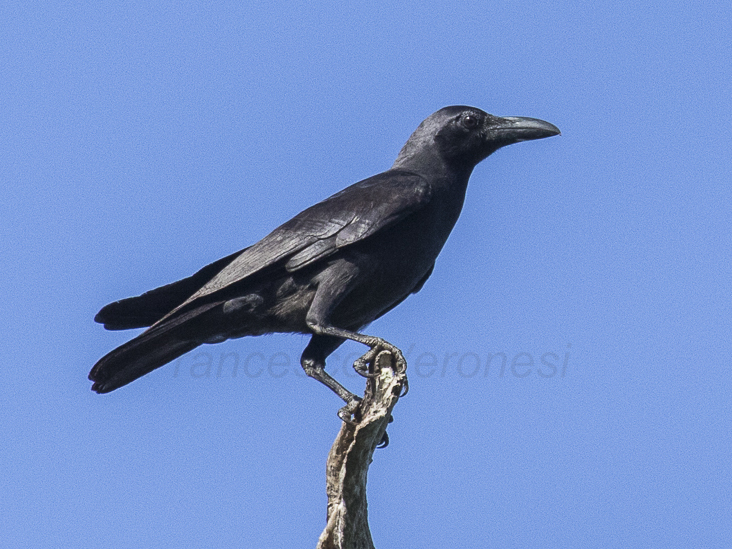

Conservation status
- Least Concern (IUCN 3.1)

Scientific classification
- Kingdom: Animalia
- Phylum: Chordata
- Class: Aves
- Order: Passeriformes
- Family: Corvidae
- Genus: Corvus
- Species: C. enca

Binomial name
- Corvus enca (Horsfield, 1821)

Synonyms
- Fregilus enca (protonym)

= Sunda crow =

Species of bird

The Sunda crow (Corvus enca) is a passerine bird of the family Corvidae that is found in South-East Asia, from Malaysia to Borneo. The Sunda crow is part of the Corvus enca species complex, which was formerly treated as a single species and known as the slender-billed crow. The complex is now treated as five species, after four subspecies were split off as distinct species: the Samar crow or small crow (Corvus samarensis), the Palawan crow (Corvus pusillus), the Sulawesi crow (Corvus celebensis) and the Sierra Madre crow (Corvus sierramadrensis). The violet crow was also once included, but has been shown to be distinct genetically and separated as Corvus violaceus.

== Taxonomy ==
Corvus enca was formally described in 1821 by the American naturalist Thomas Horsfield based on a specimen collected on the Indonesian island of Java. He coined the binomial name Fregilus enca. The specific epithet enca is a Javanese word for a crow.

Corvus enca is part of a species complex, which was previously treated as a single species with six subspecies, then known of as the slender-billed crow. Four of those subspecies are now treated as a separate species:

- Sulawesi crow (Corvus celebensis)
- Samar crow (Corvus samarensis)
- Sierra Madre crow (Corvus sierramadrensis)
- Palawan crow (Corvus pusillus)

The remaining two subspecies are recognised as subspecies of the Sunda crow:

- C. e. compilator Richmond, 1903 – Malay Peninsula, Sumatra, west Sumatran islands and Borneo
- C. e. enca (Horsfield, 1821) – Java and Bali

In earlier treatments, the Banggai Crow (Corvus unicolor) and the Violet Crow (Corvus violaceus) were also included in Corvus enca.

== Habitat and diet ==
It is found throughout Maritime Southeast Asia (Brunei, Indonesia and the Philippines) and Peninsular Malaysia. Its natural habitats are subtropical or tropical moist lowland forest and subtropical or tropical mangrove forest. It eats fish and shrimp.
