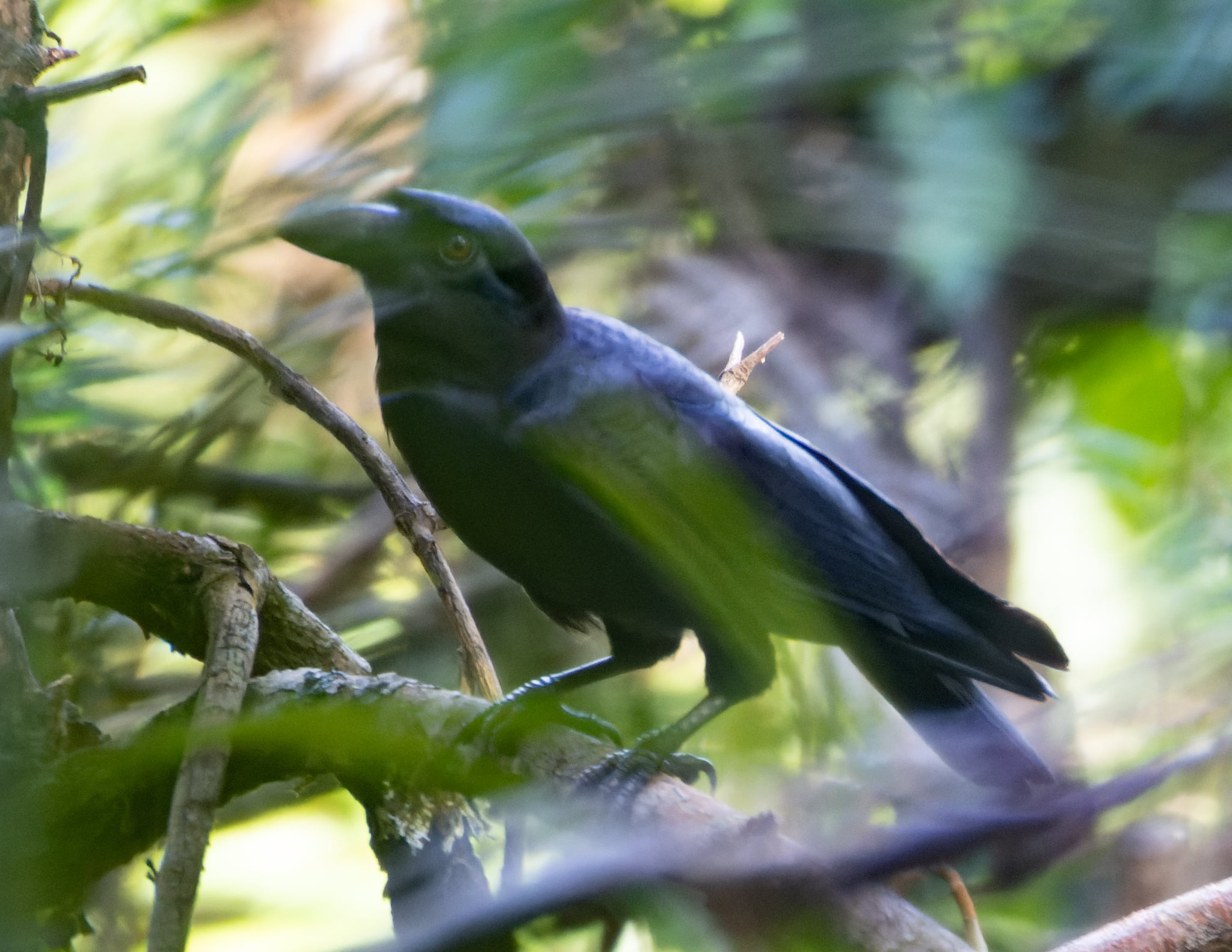

Conservation status
- Endangered (IUCN 3.1)

Scientific classification
- Kingdom: Animalia
- Phylum: Chordata
- Class: Aves
- Order: Passeriformes
- Family: Corvidae
- Genus: Corvus
- Species: C. samarensis

Binomial name
- Corvus samarensis Steere, 1890

Synonyms
- Corvus enca samarensis Steere, 1890

= Samar crow =

Species of bird

The Samar crow (Corvus samarensis), formerly known as the small crow, is a passerine bird in the genus Corvus of the family Corvidae. It is endemic to the islands of Samar and Mindanao in the Philippines. It had not been recorded in Mindanao since the 1980s until it was photographed in Davao Oriental in 2026. Its natural habitats are primary tropical moist lowland forest. It is threatened by habitat loss and hunting. It has been assessed as endangered species (IUCN status) in 2026 with an estimated population of just 1,000 to 2,500 mature individuals.

== Description and taxonomy ==
The Samar crow is a small, short-tailed crow with bare facial skin and a distinctive whirring flight style. It is found in pristine primary forests. Its call is described as a high pitched squeal not typical for a crow.

It may be distinguished from the Sierra Madre crow by its shorter and thinner bill, more intense black plumage, and darker gray feathers on the base of its neck. Its call is also described as lower pitched than that of the Sierra Madre crow.

It was previously considered a subspecies of the Slender-billed crow (now Sunda crow), but phylogenetic evidence proved that the slender-billed crow subspecies complex contained multiple distinct species. A split by the International Ornithologists' Union yielded a new species recognized as the small crow, which contained two subspecies - namely, the Samar crow, and the Sierra Madre crow. Shortly after, these 2 subspecies were themselves designated as distinct species.

The species is monotypic: no subspecies are recognised. However, the population on Mindanao has not been recorded since the 1980s and was thought to be extinct until photographed in Davao Oriental in 2026. Due to a lack of records, it could possibly have represented a subspecies or even a distinct species. Though the lone recording of a Samar crow in Mindanao by Robert Kennedy demonstrated a lower pitched call compared to the other populations on Samar, there nonetheless remains a lack of evidence for its distinctiveness as a species or subspecies.

== Ecology and behavior ==
This species is poorly studied and not much is known about its ecology. It is typically observed in pairs or small family groups. It is believed to be omnivorous and has been observed feeding with other birds in fruiting trees. It also feeds on insects, small lizards and roadkill.

Nothing is known about its breeding habits, but based on studies of the closely related Sunda crow it is likely that it builds bulky masses of twigs on large trees. The average clutch size of the Sunda crow is 2 eggs and most of the incubation is done by the female.

== Habitat and conservation status ==
It is found in tropical moist lowland forest, where it is extremely intolerant of any disturbance.

IUCN has yet to assess this bird, but due to its preference for pristine forest, general rarity, and lack of records in past decades in Mindanao, it is likely to be threatened. Deforestation through illegal logging and slash-and-burn agriculture continues across most of its remaining habitat. It is also believed to face interspecific competition from the Philippine jungle crow, which is more aggressive and adaptable to disturbed habitats.

The Samar crow occurs in only one protected area in the Samar Island Natural Park, but actual protection and enforcement from illegal logging and hunting are lax. Biologists from the Philippine Eagle Foundation have reported this species in Mount Hamiguitan and Mount Apo however these records are yet to be fully confirmed
