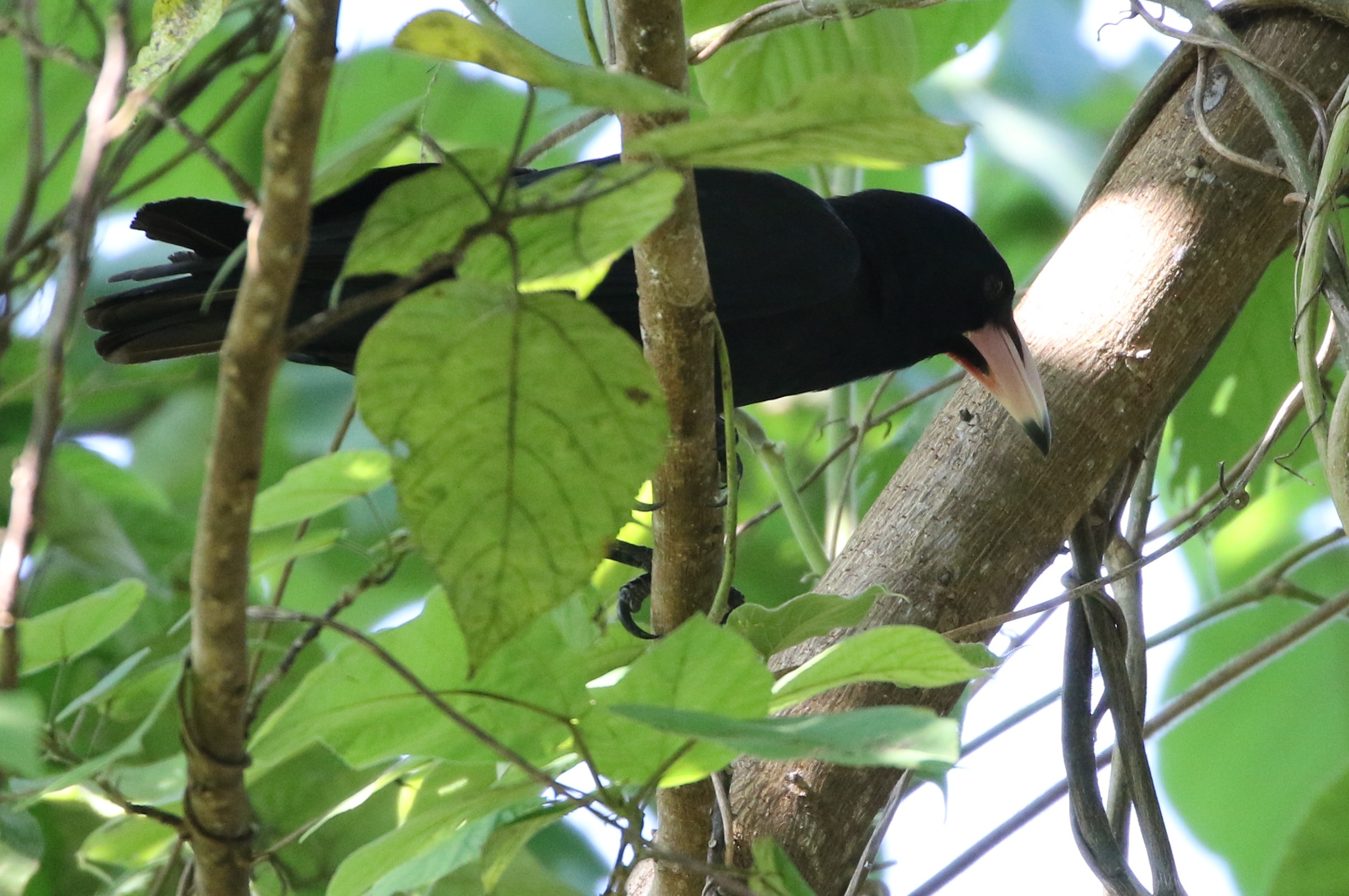

Conservation status
- Least Concern (IUCN 3.1)

Scientific classification
- Kingdom: Animalia
- Phylum: Chordata
- Class: Aves
- Order: Passeriformes
- Family: Corvidae
- Genus: Corvus
- Species: C. woodfordi

Binomial name
- Corvus woodfordi (Ogilvie-Grant, 1887)

= White-billed crow =

Species of bird

The white-billed crow (Corvus woodfordi) is a member of the crow family found on the Solomon Islands.

== Description ==
It is a short and stocky forest bird (40–41 cm in length) with a short, squared-off tail and a relatively large head with a very distinctive deep and curved pale ivory-coloured bill with a darker tip. The dark nasal bristles, though not thick, are quite apparent against the pale coloured bill. The bird overall is very glossy black with a greenish-purple gloss to the head and purple gloss to the rest of the body. The iris is pale grey or white in the adult bird and the legs and feet are black.

The voice is described as being reminiscent of the Torresian crow but higher in pitch and faster, giving an "ao-ao-ao" sound.

This species is confined to the central part of the Solomon Islands and can be found specifically on the islands of Choiseul, Isabel and Guadalcanal where it forages in small family groups through the trees, feeding on various insects and fruits. It is normally difficult to view as it often remains well hidden in the high forest canopy while feeding and even flying low, just over the tops of the trees when moving on.

As is the case with many forest crows, there is little information on the species' breeding habits.
