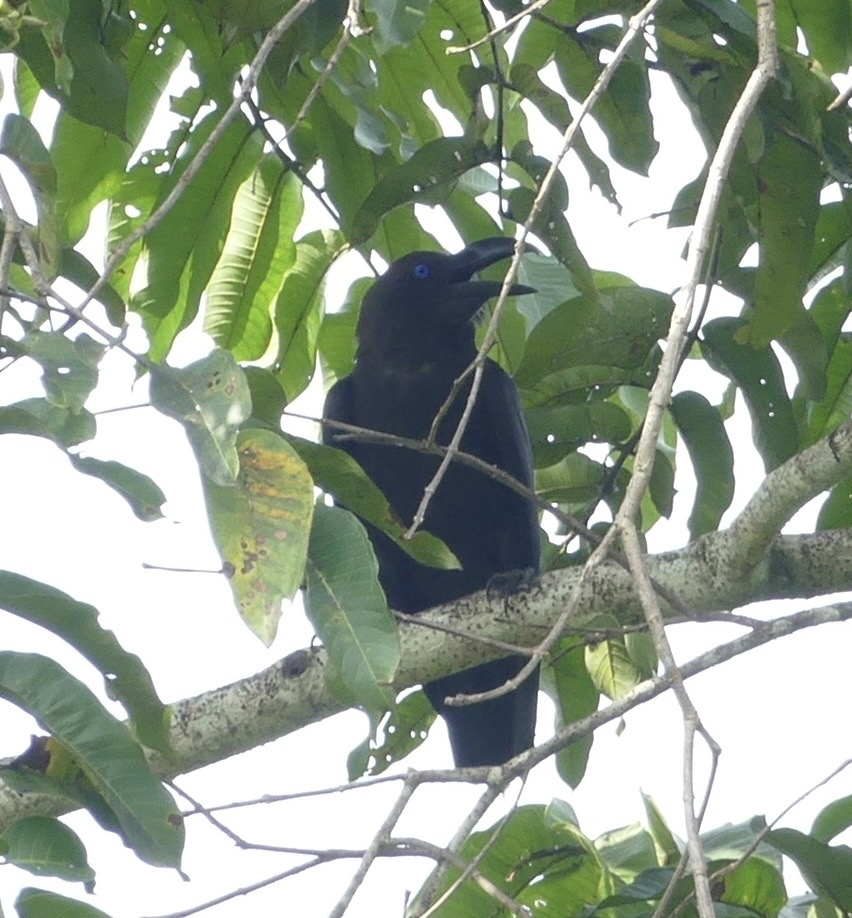

Conservation status
- Least Concern (IUCN 3.1)

Scientific classification
- Kingdom: Animalia
- Phylum: Chordata
- Class: Aves
- Order: Passeriformes
- Family: Corvidae
- Genus: Corvus
- Species: C. fuscicapillus

Binomial name
- Corvus fuscicapillus G.R. Gray, 1859

= Brown-headed crow =

Species of bird

The brown-headed crow (Corvus fuscicapillus) is a passerine bird of the genus Corvus in the family Corvidae. Endemic to Indonesia, it has a fragmented distribution in subtropical or tropical moist lowland forest and subtropical or tropical mangrove forest. It is threatened by habitat destruction and the IUCN has rated it as being "Least Concern".

== Description ==
The brown-headed crow grows to a total length of about 22 in (56 cm) including a 7 in (18 cm) tail. It has the typical glossy purplish-black plumage of many of the crow genus apart from the head and neck which are a dark brownish-black. The tail has a squared-off end. The massive beak is compressed and has a high arch, being black in males and reddish or yellowish-white with a black tip in females and juveniles. The legs are black and the face is well-feathered. The nasal bristles are distinctly parted and the throat feathers are bristly. The call is a harsh caw, either in brief, two-syllable utterances or as longer, drawn-out sounds.

== Distribution and habitat ==
The species is endemic to eastern Indonesia; it has a fragmented range, perhaps because it has some, as yet unknown, specialised habitat requirement. It is present in northern Papua in the lower part of the Mamberamo River Valley and in the Nimbokrang region, near Jayapura. Also on the islands of Waigeo and Gemien in western Papua, and Nimbokrang and the Aru Islands in Maluku province. Its habitat is primarily virgin forest but it also inhabits secondary growth and mangrove areas, but generally avoids open countryside and the coast. Its altitudinal range is up to about 500 m (1,600 ft).

== Ecology ==
This crow moves through the canopy either in pairs or alone, or occasionally in a group of a few birds. It feeds on fruit which it gathers from among the foliage.

== Status ==
C. fuscicapillus is an uncommon species with a limited, fragmented range. Its total area of occupancy is estimated to be about 18,400 km^{2} (7,100 sq mi) and the total population may be between 15,000 and 30,000 birds. The main threats it faces are habitat destruction through logging and mining, and a planned dam across the Mamberamo River. However some of its range is within protected areas, and in some parts the forest remains untouched. The International Union for Conservation of Nature formerly assessed its conservation status as being "Near Threatened", though since 20 July 2023 this has improved to "Least Concern".
