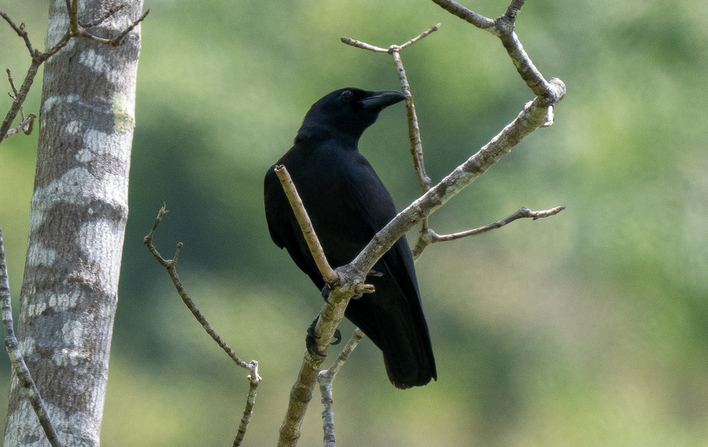

Scientific classification
- Kingdom: Animalia
- Phylum: Chordata
- Class: Aves
- Order: Passeriformes
- Family: Corvidae
- Genus: Corvus
- Species: C. pusillus

Binomial name
- Corvus pusillus Tweeddale, 1878

= Palawan crow =

Species of bird

The Palawan crow (Corvus pusillus) is a passerine bird of the family Corvidae, in the genus Corvus. It was previously considered a subspecies of the slender-billed crow, but phylogenetic evidence indicates that the two are distinct species, and it has thus been split by the International Ornithologists' Union.

It is endemic to the Philippines, where it is found on Mindoro, Palawan, and the Calamian Islands. Its natural habitats are tropical moist lowland forest and tropical mangrove forest.

== Description and taxonomy ==
It is part of the Slender-billed crow species complex which now 5 distinct and separate species. The Palawan crow is differentiated by its ashy gray plumage, lanky structure and distinct frog-like call.

== Ecology and behavior ==
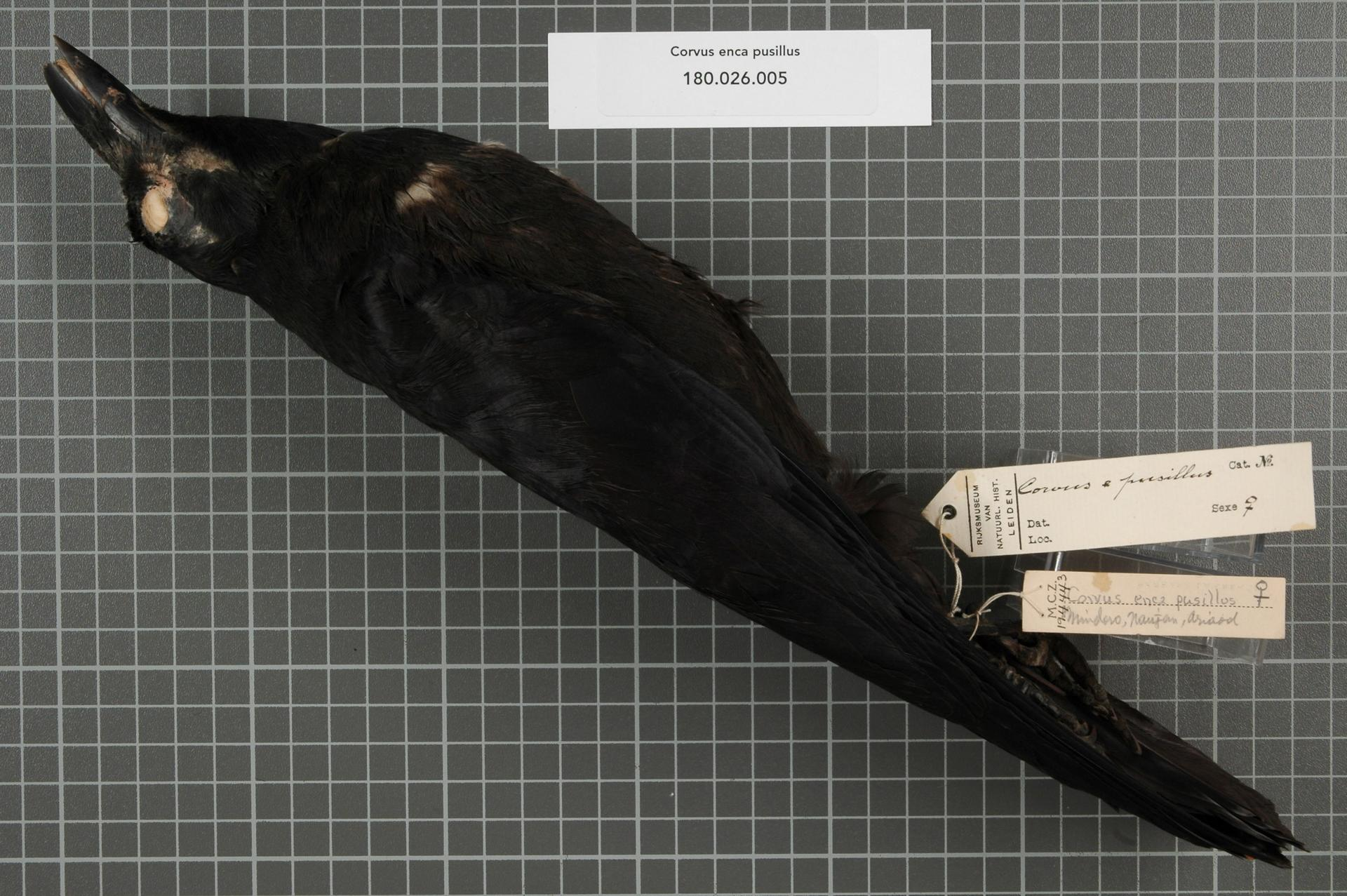
Preserved specimen at Naturalis Biodiversity Center

No species specific studies on its ecology have been conducted on the Palawan crow but diet and breeding habits believed to be similar to the Slender-billed crow which is omnivorous and feeds on fruits, insects, small lizards and even carrion. The Slender-billed crow also nests in a bulky mass of stick in large tree high up the cannopy. Clutch size is 2 eggs and is incubated mostly by the female. Both parents feed the chick.

== Habitat and conservation status ==
Its natural habitat is tropical moist lowland forests and forest edge up to 1,000 meters above sea level.

The International Union for Conservation of Nature has yet to recognize this as a distinct species but this bird is common throughout its range and is seen in degraded habitats and is not believed to be threatened.
