= Sierra Madre crow =

Conservation status
- Not evaluated (IUCN 3.1)

Scientific classification
- Kingdom: Animalia
- Phylum: Chordata
- Class: Aves
- Order: Passeriformes
- Family: Corvidae
- Genus: Corvus
- Species: C. sierramadrensis

Binomial name
- Corvus sierramadrensis Rand & Rabor, 1961

Synonyms
- Corvus enca sierramadrensis (protonym)

Species of bird

The Sierra Madre crow (Corvus sierramadrensis) is a passerine bird in the crow family Corvidae that is endemic to the island of Luzon in the Philippines. It was formerly considered as conspecific with the Samar crow with the combined taxa known as the small crow. Its natural habitats are primary tropical moist lowland forest. It is now extremely rare and likely endangered. It is threatened by habitat loss and hunting.

== Description and taxonomy ==
Described as a small and short tailed crow with bare facial skin and a distinctive whirring flight style found in pristine primary forests. Its call is described as a high pitched squeals not typical for a crow.

It is very similar to the Samar crow but it has a longer and thicker bill, less intense black plumage and paler gray feathers on the base of its neck. It also differs in voice which is described as three to four throaty squeals and another call described as a buzzy and throaty single note.

The Sierra Madre crow was formally described in 1961 by the Canadian ornithologist Austin L. Rand and the Filipino ornithologist Dioscoro S. Rabor based on a specimen collected in the Sierra Madre mountains on the island of Luzon in the Philippines. They considered the specimen to be a subspecies of the Slender-billed crow (now Sunda crow) and coined the trinomial name Corvus enca sierramadrensis. It was then formerly treated as a subspecies of the Samar crow (Corvus samarensis) but is now separated as a distinct species based on vocal and morphological differences. The species is monotypic: no subspecies are recognised.

== Ecology and behavior ==
This species is poorly studied and not much is known about its ecology. It is typically observed in pairs or small family groups. Its believed to be omnivorous and has been observed feeding with other birds in fruiting trees. It also feeds on insects, small lizards and roadkill. Nothing is known about its breeding habits but based on the studies of the closely related Sunda crow it is likely that it builds a bulky mass of twigs on a large tree. Average clutch size is 2 eggs and most of the incubation is done by the female.

== Habitat and conservation status ==
It is found in tropical moist lowland forest where it is extremely intolerant of any disturbance.

IUCN has yet to assess this bird but due to their preference for pristine forest, general rarity and lack of records is safe to assume that this bird is threatened. Deforestation through illegal logging and slash-and-burn continues across most of its remaining habitat. It is also believed to face interspecific competition from Philippine jungle crow which is more aggressive and adaptable to disturbed habitats.

Occurs in a few protected areas like the Northern Sierra Madre Natural Park and Kalbario–Patapat Natural Park ut actual protection and enforcement from illegal logging and hunting are lax
