= Bougainville crow =

Conservation status
- Least Concern (IUCN 3.1)

Scientific classification
- Kingdom: Animalia
- Phylum: Chordata
- Class: Aves
- Order: Passeriformes
- Family: Corvidae
- Genus: Corvus
- Species: C. meeki

Binomial name
- Corvus meeki Rothschild, 1904

Species of bird

The Bougainville crow (Corvus meeki) is a species of bird in the crow family, Corvidae.

It is found in on the island of Bougainville in Papua New Guinea and the neighbouring Shortland Islands in the Solomon Islands. Within its range it is the only species of crow.

The Bougainville crow is 41 cm long, with black plumage and a large black bill.

Its natural habitats are subtropical or tropical moist lowland forest and subtropical or tropical moist montane forest up to 1600 m. It is a common species on Bougainville, but it might be threatened in the future by habitat loss caused by logging.
