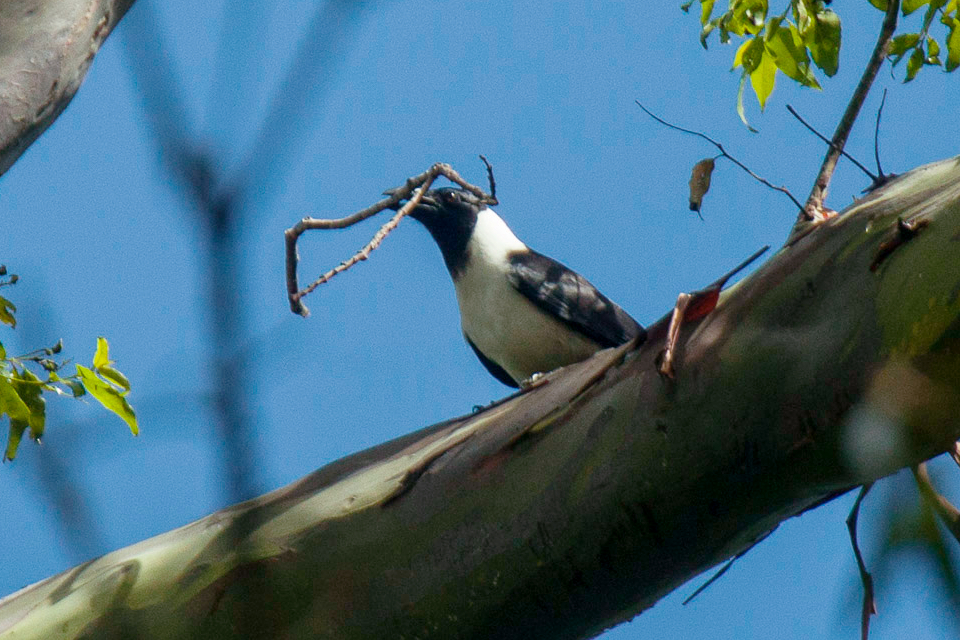
- In Sulawesi, Indonesia

Conservation status
- Least Concern (IUCN 3.1)

Scientific classification
- Kingdom: Animalia
- Phylum: Chordata
- Class: Aves
- Order: Passeriformes
- Family: Corvidae
- Genus: Corvus
- Species: C. typicus

Binomial name
- Corvus typicus (Bonaparte, 1853)

= Piping crow =

Species of bird

The piping crow (Corvus typicus) is a species of bird in the family Corvidae. It is endemic to Sulawesi in Indonesia. Its natural habitat is subtropical or tropical moist lowland forest.
