= List of Corvus species =

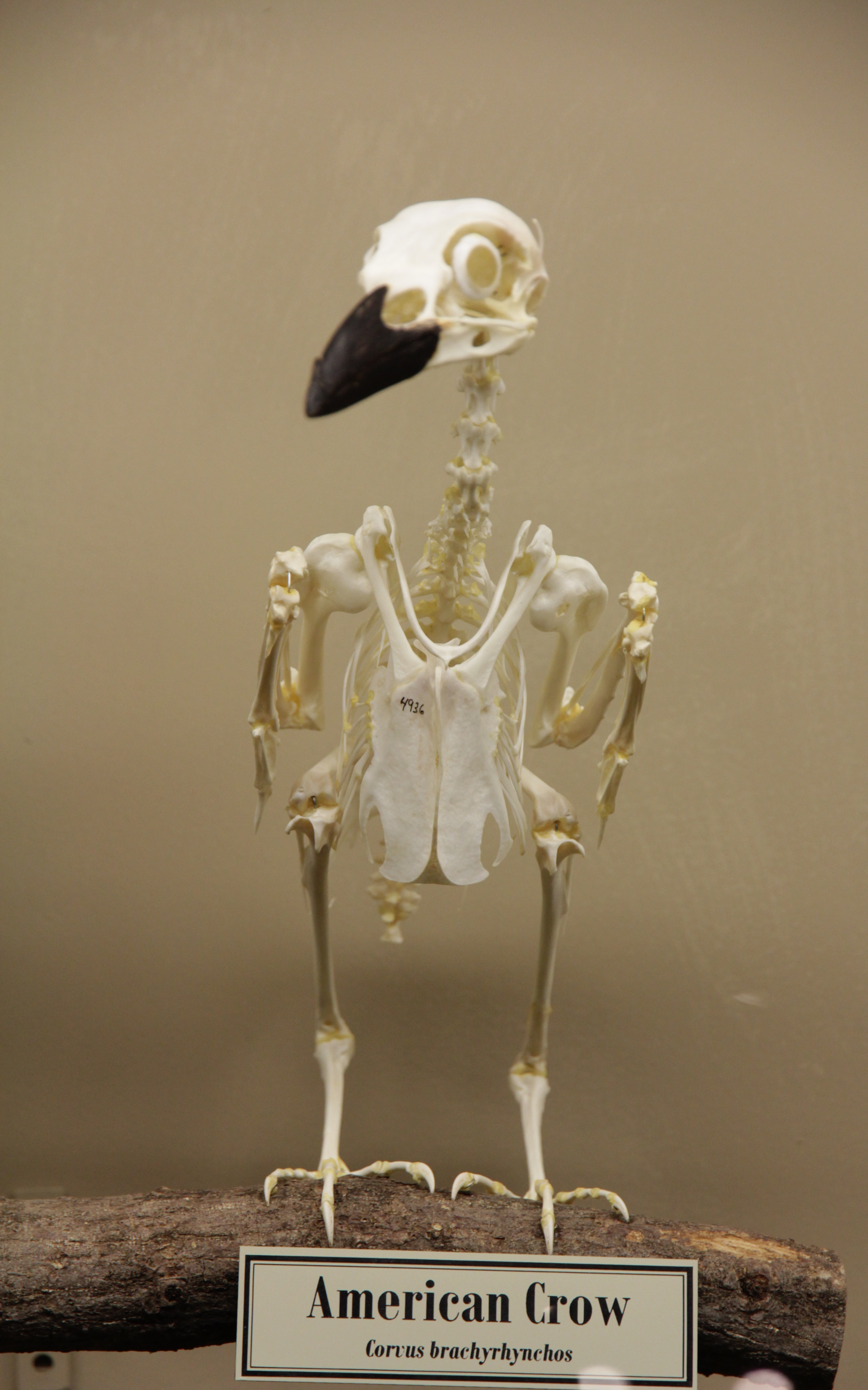
The skeleton of American crow (the Museum of Osteology)

The following is a list of all currently recognized species within the passerine bird genus Corvus (the crows and ravens).

== Extant species ==
The genus contains 48 species:

- Corvus splendens Vieillot, 1817 – house crow, grey-necked crow, Indian house crow, Sri Lankan crow or Colombo crow (Indian subcontinent, Southeast Asia, Middle East, eastern Africa)
- Corvus moneduloides Lesson, RP, 1831 – New Caledonian crow (New Caledonia)
- Corvus typicus (Bonaparte, 1853) – piping crow or Celebes pied crow (Sulawesi and Muna, Indonesia)
- Corvus unicolor (Rothschild & Hartert, EJO, 1900) – Banggai crow (Banggai Island, Indonesia)
- Corvus enca (Horsfield, 1821) – Sunda crow, formerly slender-billed crow (Malaysia, the Philippines, Borneo, Indonesia)
- Corvus celebensis Stresemann, 1936 – Sulawesi crow (Sulawesi and the Sula Islands)
- Corvus samarensis Steere, 1890 – Samar crow, formerly small crow (Samar and Mindanao, Philippines)
- Corvus sierramadrensis Rand & Rabor, 1961 – Sierra Madre crow (Luzon, Philippines)
- Corvus pusillus Tweeddale, 1878 – Palawan crow (Palawan, Philippines)
- Corvus violaceus Bonaparte, 1850 – violet crow (Seram, Indonesia)
- Corvus florensis Büttikofer, 1894 – Flores crow (Flores, Indonesia)
- Corvus kubaryi Reichenow, 1885 – Mariana crow or aga (Guam and Rota, Northern Mariana Islands)
- Corvus validus Bonaparte, 1850 – long-billed crow (northern Moluccas, Indonesia)
- Corvus woodfordi (Ogilvie-Grant, 1887) – white-billed crow or Solomon Islands crow (southern Solomon Islands)
- Corvus meeki Rothschild, 1904 – Bougainville crow or Solomon Islands crow (Bougainville Island and Shortland Islands, Solomon Islands)
- Corvus fuscicapillus Gray, GR, 1859 – brown-headed crow (New Guinea)
- Corvus tristis Lesson, RP & Garnot, 1827 – grey crow, formerly bare-faced crow (New Guinea and nearby islands)
- Corvus capensis Lichtenstein, MHC, 1823 – Cape crow or black crow (east and southern Africa)
- Corvus frugilegus Linnaeus, 1758 – rook (Eurasia, introduced to New Zealand)
- Corvus brachyrhynchos Brehm, CL, 1822 – American crow, formerly common crow (the United States, southern Canada and northern Mexico)
- Corvus imparatus Peters, JL, 1929 – Tamaulipas crow (Gulf of Mexico coast of Texas and northeastern Mexico)
- Corvus sinaloae Davis, LI, 1958 –– Sinaloa crow (Pacific Coast of Mexico)
- Corvus ossifragus Wilson, A, 1812 – fish crow (eastern United States coast)
- Corvus palmarum Württemberg, 1835 – Hispaniolan palm crow (Hispaniola) (formerly conspecific with the Cuban palm crow)
- Corvus minutus Gundlach, 1852 – Cuban palm crow (Cuba) (formerly conspecific with the Hispaniolan palm crow)
- Corvus jamaicensis Gmelin, JF, 1788 – Jamaican crow (Jamaica)
- Corvus nasicus Temminck, 1826 – Cuban crow (Cuba, Isla de la Juventud, Turks and Caicos Islands)
- Corvus leucognaphalus Daudin, 1800 – white-necked crow (Hispaniola)
- Corvus hawaiiensis Peale, 1849 (formerly C. tropicus) – Hawaiian crow (Hawaii)
- Corvus corone Linnaeus, 1758 – carrion crow (Eurasia)
- Corvus cornix Linnaeus, 1758 – hooded crow (northern and eastern Europe and northern Africa)
- Corvus torquatus Lesson, RP, 1831 – collared crow, ring-necked crow or white-collared crow (eastern China south into Vietnam)
- Corvus macrorhynchos Wagler, 1827 – large-billed crow or thick-billed crow, formerly jungle crow (Himalayas, East Asia, the Malay Peninsula, Sunda Islands, and the Philippines)
- Corvus philippinus Bonaparte, 1853 – Philippine jungle crow (Philippines)
- Corvus orru Bonaparte, 1850 – Torresian crow, Australian crow or Papuan crow (Australia, New Guinea, Lesser Sunda Islands)
- Corvus insularis Heinroth, 1903 – Bismarck crow (Bismark Archipelago, Papua New Guinea)
- Corvus bennetti North, 1901 – little crow (Australia)
- Corvus tasmanicus Mathews, 1912 – forest raven or Tasmanian raven (Tasmania and adjacent southern coast of Australia)
- Corvus mellori Mathews, 1912 – little raven (southeastern Australia)
- Corvus coronoides Vigors & Horsfield, 1827 – Australian raven (eastern and southern Australia)
- Corvus albus Müller, PLS, 1776 – pied crow (Central African coasts to southern Africa)
- Corvus ruficollis Lesson, RP, 1831 – brown-necked raven (north Africa, Arabian Peninsula, Iran, Central Asia, Pakistan)
- Corvus edithae Lort Phillips, 1895 – Somali crow or dwarf raven (eastern Africa)
- Corvus corax Linnaeus, 1758 – common raven or northern raven (the Holarctic regions of the Northern Hemisphere)
- Corvus cryptoleucus Couch, 1854 – Chihuahuan raven (southwestern United States and northwestern Mexico)
- Corvus rhipidurus Hartert, EJO, 1918 – fan-tailed raven (eastern Africa, Middle East)
- Corvus albicollis Latham, 1790 – white-necked raven or Cape raven (southern, central, and eastern Africa)
- Corvus crassirostris Rüppell, 1836 – thick-billed raven (Ethiopia)

== Fossil and prehistoric species ==
- † Corvus galushai – (fossil: Big Sandy Late Miocene of Wickieup, United States)
- † Corvus praecorax – (fossil: Early Pliocene of Perpignan, France; possibly a subspecies of C. corone / C. cornix)
- † Corvus simionescui – (fossil: Early Pliocene of Maluşteni-Bereşti, Romania; possibly a subspecies of C. corone / C. cornix)
- † Corvus hungaricus – (fossil: Late Pliocene / Early Pleistocene of Southern Europe; tentatively placed here)
- † Corvus venustus – (fossil: Early Pleistocene of Crimea)
- † Corvus moravicus – (fossil: Late Pliocene / Early Pleistocene of Central to Eastern Europe; possibly a subspecies of C. monedula)
- † Corvus pliocaenus – (fossil: Late Pliocene / Early Pleistocene of Europe; possibly a subspecies of C. corone / C. cornix)
- † Corvus antecorax – (fossil: Late Pliocene / Early Pleistocene of Europe; may be C. janossyi, possibly a subspecies of C. corax)
- † Corvus bragai – (fossil: Pliocene / Pleistocene transition of South Africa)
- † Corvus betfianus – (fossil: Late Pliocene / Early Pleistocene of Betfi, Romania; possibly a subspecies of C. corone / C. cornix)
- † Corvus fossilis – (fossil: Late Pleistocene Seveckenberg, Germany; probably a subspecies of C. corax)
- † Corvus neomexicanus – (fossil: Late Pleistocene of Dry Cave, United States)
- † Corvus impluviatus – high-billed crow or deep-billed crow (prehistoric: Hawaii)
- † Corvus moriorum – New Zealand raven (prehistoric; New Zealand and the Chatham Islands, the Southwest Pacific Ocean)
  - † C. m. moriorum - Chatham raven (the Chatham Islands)
  - † C. m. antipodum - North Island raven (North Island, New Zealand)
  - † C. m. pycrafti - South Island raven (South Island, New Zealand)
- † Corvus pumilis – Puerto Rican crow (prehistoric: Puerto Rico; possibly a subspecies of C. nasicus / C. palmarum)
- † Corvus viriosus – robust crow or slender-billed crow (prehistoric: Hawaii)
- † Corvus sp. – New Ireland crow (prehistoric: New Ireland, Melanesia)

The taxonomy of the C. antecorax / C. fossilis complex as well as the C. pliocaenus / C. betfianus / C. praecorax / C. simionescui complex, in particular the temporal succession and their relationships to their living relatives, is not yet fully resolved. At least some of these "species" seem to have been direct ancestors of the living forms as listed above.

== Former species ==
Formerly, some authorities also considered the following species as species within the genus Corvus:

- Western jackdaw (as Corvus monedula)
- Daurian jackdaw (as Corvus dauuricus)
- Eurasian jay (as Corvus glandarius)
- Northwestern crow (the Olympic Peninsula to southwestern Alaska). Corvus caurinus was once considered a separate species from Corvus brachyrhynchos (the American crow) but has since been merged into it due to genetic overlap and mating patterns.
