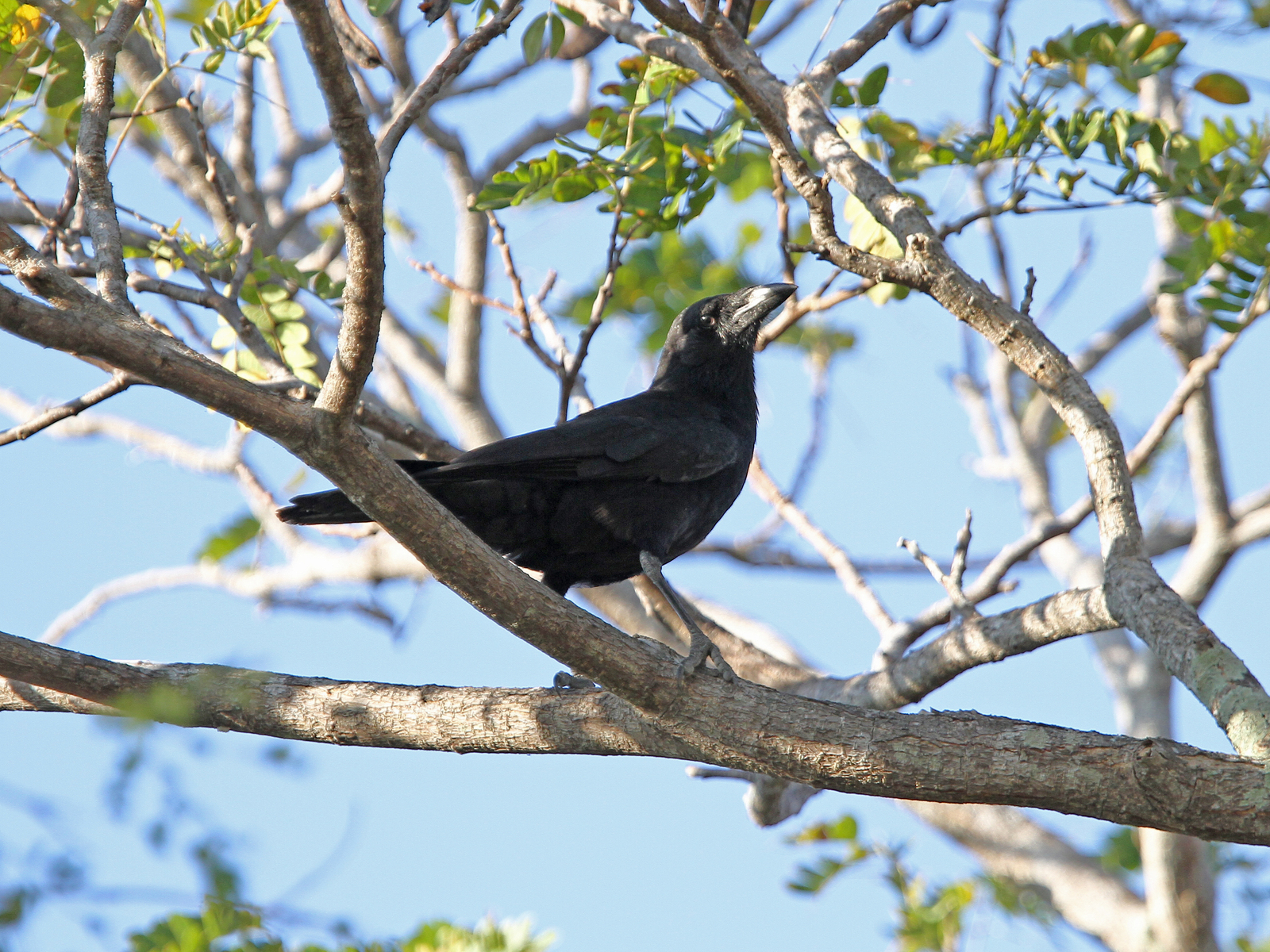
- In Najasa, Camagüey, Cuba

Scientific classification
- Kingdom: Animalia
- Phylum: Chordata
- Class: Aves
- Order: Passeriformes
- Family: Corvidae
- Genus: Corvus
- Species: C. minutus

Binomial name
- Corvus minutus Gundlach, 1852

= Cuban palm crow =

Species of bird

The Cuban palm crow (Corvus minutus) is a relatively small corvid that is endemic to the Caribbean island of Cuba.

== Taxonomy and systematics ==
The Cuban palm crow was formally described in 1852 by the German-born ornithologist Juan Gundlach with the binomial Corvus minutus. It was long treated as a subspecies of Corvus palmarum, which was then called the "palm crow". Most taxonomic systems eventually followed a 1997 publication in recognizing the Cuban and Hispaniolan palm crows as separate monotypic species. However, as of late 2025, BirdLife International's Handbook of the Birds of the World (HBW) retains the "palm crow" as a single species with two subspecies.

Despite the Cuban palm crow's being sympatric with the Cuban crow (Corvus nasicus) on Cuba, it appears to be more closely related to the fish crow (C. ossifragus) of the East Coast of the United States and two smaller species, the Tamaulipas crow (C. imparatus) and Sinaloa crow (C. sinaloae) of Mexico, than to the Cuban crow. The Cuban crow is more closely related to the white-necked crow (C. leucognaphalus) and the Jamaican crow (C. jamaicensis), the other two Caribbean corvids. This indicates two distinct arrivals of crows onto the island of Cuba (with the ancestor of the two palm crows being a later arrival), and a resulting niche differentiation, similar to that of C. leucognaphalus and C. palmarum on Hispaniola.

The following cladogram is based on phylogenetic study of the Corvidae by Knud Jønsson and collaborators that was published in 2012.

- - - Hispaniolan palm crow, Corvus palmarum
    - Cuban palm crow, Corvus minutus
  - - Fish crow, Corvus ossifragus
    - - Sinaloa crow, Corvus sinaloae
      - Tamaulipas crow, Corvus imparatus

== Description ==
The Cuban palm crow is 34 to 43 cm (13 to 17 in) long; one male weighed 315 g (11 oz) and one female 263 g (9.3 oz). The sexes have the same plumage; males are larger than females. Adults are entirely black with much violet iridescence when fresh and which becomes dull brownish black when worn. They have a dark brown iris, a black or blackish bill, and black or blackish legs and feet. Juveniles are overall duller than adults.

== Distribution and habitat ==
The Cuban palm crow is found at scattered sites in Cienfuegos and Sancti Spíritus provinces and separately in Camagüey Province. It apparently was formerly more widespread. A 2003 field guide places it in Pinar del Río Province but a 2020 checklist notes that the province has had only one (undocumented) report since the 1970s. It inhabits human-modified landscapes such as cleared areas with "islands" of trees or palms and also the edges of pine forest, palm savanna, and scrublands. In elevation it ranges almost entirely between sea level and 600 m (2,000 ft).

== Behavior ==
=== Movement ===
The Cuban palm crow is a year-round resident.

=== Feeding ===
The Cuban palm crow is omnivorous. Though no detailed studies of its diet have been made, it is known to eat invertebrates like insects and snails, small vertebrates such as lizards, fruits, and seeds. It typically forages in pairs or in flocks of up to about 20 individuals, and uses all levels of its habitat.

=== Breeding ===
The Cuban palm crow's breeding season has not been established but appears to fall within the months of April through July. Its nest is a stick platform lined with grasses and other soft material, and most known nests were built at the base of palm fronds. Six clutches averaged 3.8 eggs. The incubation period is 19 to 22 days and fledging occurs 34 to 35 days after hatch. Details of parental care are not known.

== Status ==
The IUCN follows HBW taxonomy and so has not separately assessed the Cuban and Hispaniolan palm crows. The "palm crow"'s population size is not known and is believed to be decreasing. "In Cuba, although partial clearance of dense forest may not have affected the species, the intensive clearance of Royal Palm Roystonea regia (in which the species nests) for agriculture and livestock grazing may be causing declines and local extirpation, such as in Camagüey province." It is considered "rare and very local". It is assessed as Endangered by Cuban authorities and has legal protection.
