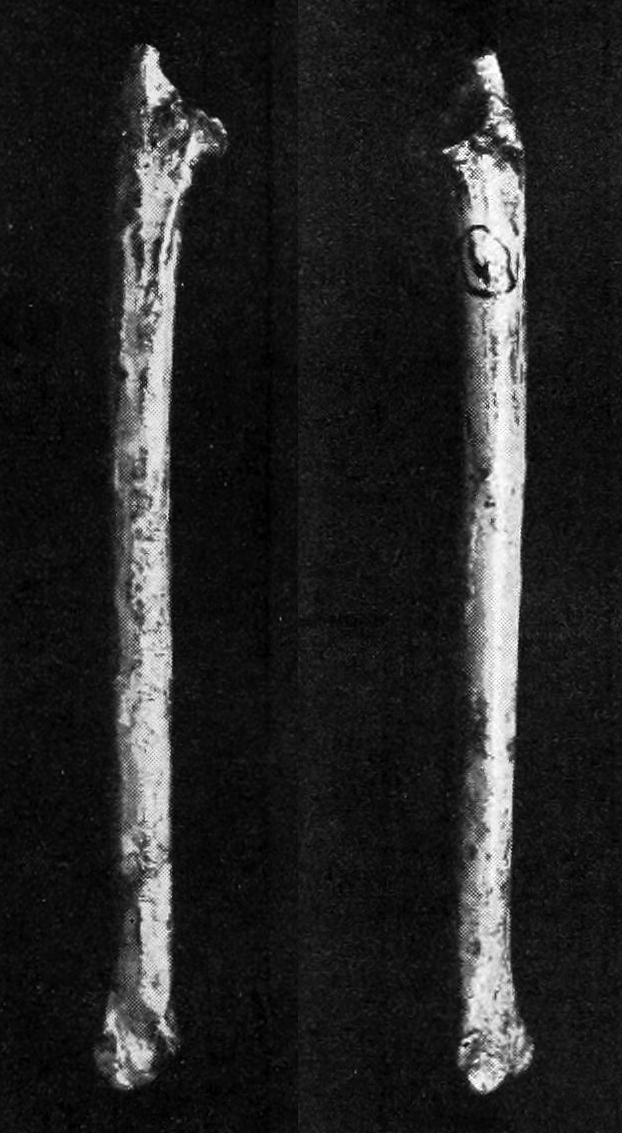
- Holotype right ulna

Scientific classification
- Kingdom: Animalia
- Phylum: Chordata
- Class: Aves
- Order: Passeriformes
- Family: Corvidae
- Genus: Corvus
- Species: †C. pumilis

Binomial name
- †Corvus pumilis (Wetmore, 1920)
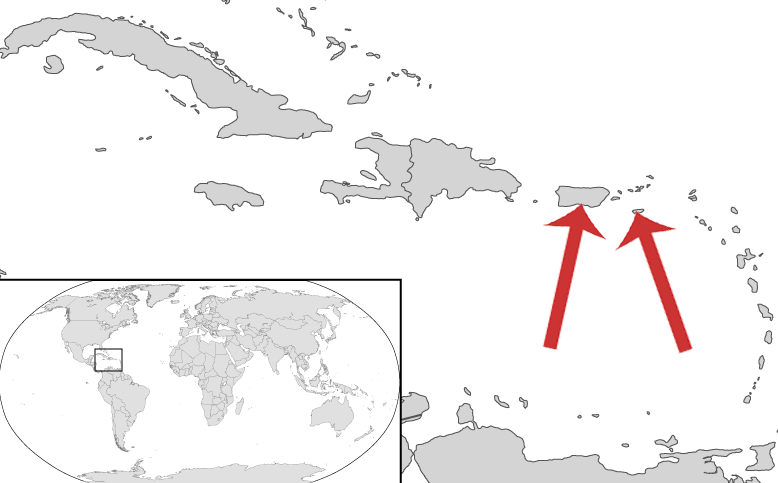
- Red arrows indicate locations of Puerto Rico and Saint Croix

= Puerto Rican crow =

Puerto Rican crow Temporal range: Holocene

Extinct species of bird

The Puerto Rican crow (Corvus pumilis) is an extinct crow species in the family Corvidae that was endemic to Puerto Rico and the United States Virgin Islands. Little is known about its habitat, but it possibly died out after the colonization of humans on these islands.

== Description ==
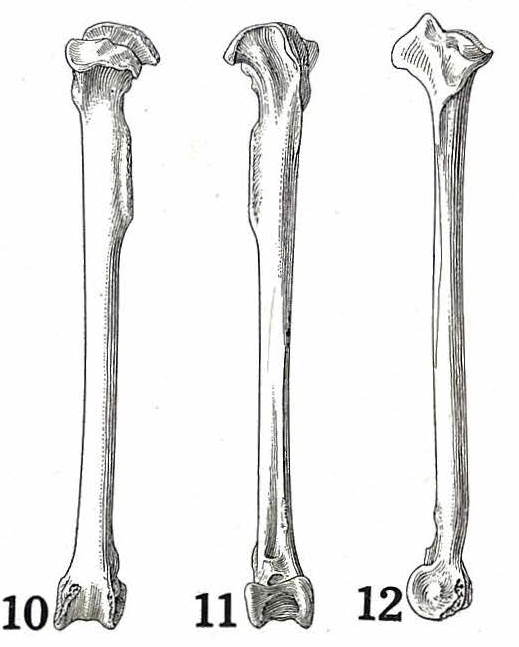
Assigned right tibiotarsus

The holotype specimen is a subfossil ulna. It was 68 mm (2.7 in) long, and lies in size between the formerly sympatric C. leucognaphalus with 76–78 mm (3.0–3.1 in) and the Hispaniolan C. palmarum with 62 mm (2.4 in).

== Habitat ==
Residues of the crow were found on Puerto Rico, and on the island St. Croix, which belongs to the United States Virgin Islands.

Little is known about its habitat. As it existed together with C. leucognaphalus on Puerto Rico, it possibly occupied a different ecological niche as the latter, and was perhaps rather common in the island's lowlands.

== Classification and taxonomy ==
The earliest residues of the crow were found in 1916, in the karst cave Cueva San Miguel near Morovis, Puerto Rico. It was a right ulna (AMNH 4925), which Alexander Wetmore described in 1920 as a holotype for his first description of the species C. pumilis. Wetmore did not comment on the etymology of the epithet pumilis, which means "dwarfish" in Latin. There are no insights on its relationships with other species of its genus within and beyond the Caribbean.

== Extinction ==
Corvus pumilis possibly became extinct before the colonization of the islands. In Puerto Rico, it is only known from lagerstätten; on St. Croix, it was found on a hearth from the Pre-Columbian era.
