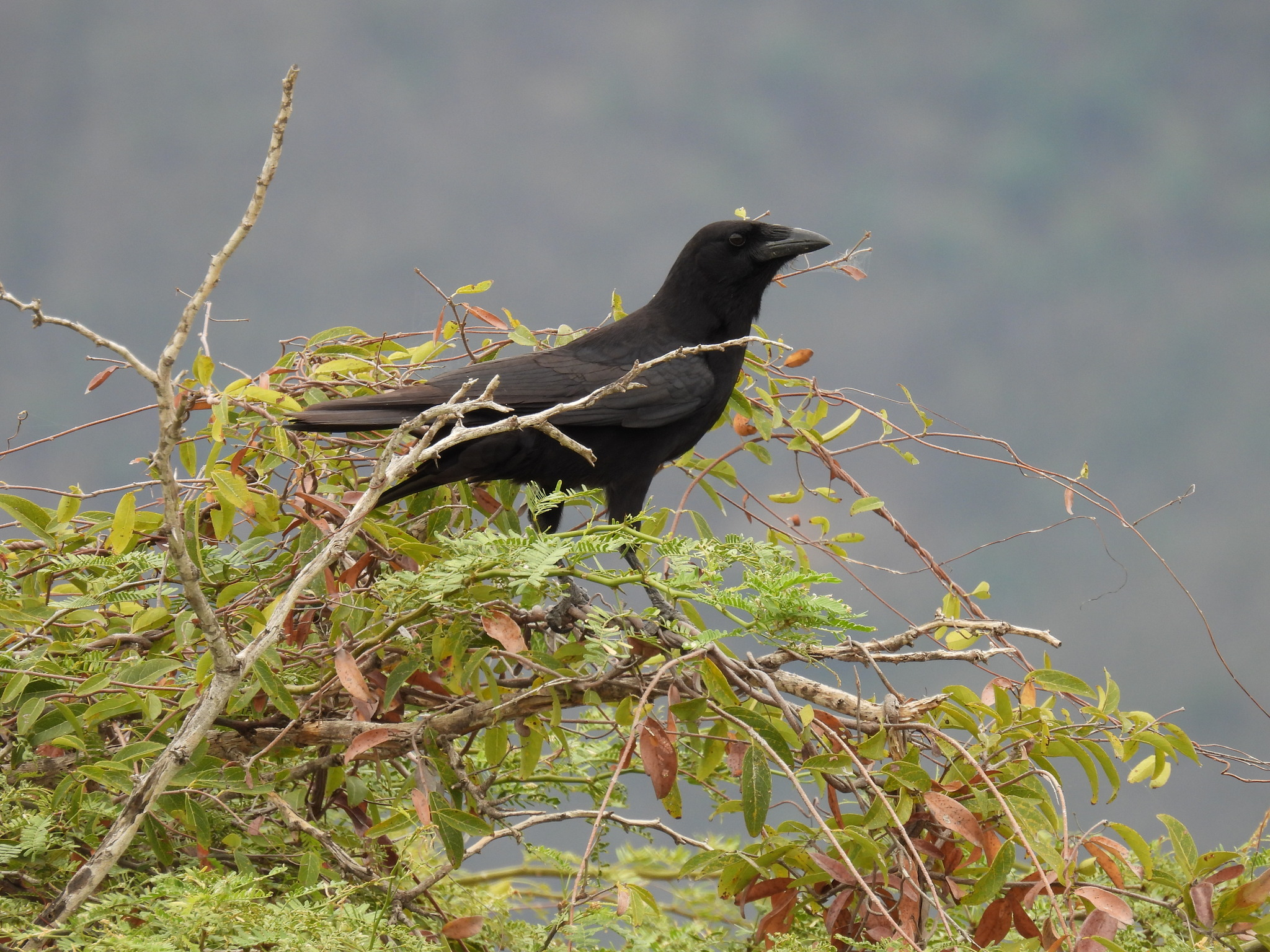
- In Dominican Republic

Scientific classification
- Kingdom: Animalia
- Phylum: Chordata
- Class: Aves
- Order: Passeriformes
- Family: Corvidae
- Genus: Corvus
- Species: C. palmarum

Binomial name
- Corvus palmarum Württemberg, 1835

= Hispaniolan palm crow =

Species of bird

The Hispaniolan palm crow (Corvus palmarum) is a relatively small corvid endemic to the Caribbean island of Hispaniola, which is shared by Haiti and the Dominican Republic.

== Taxonomy and systematics ==
The Hispaniolan palm crow was originally described in 1835 by the German naturalist Duke Paul Wilhelm of Württemberg with the binomial Corvus palmarum. At the time it included what is now the Cuban palm crow (Corvus minutus); the taxon was called the palm crow. Most taxonomic systems eventually followed a 1997 publication in recognizing the Hispaniolan and Cuban palm crows as separate monotypic species. However, as of late 2025, BirdLife International's Handbook of the Birds of the World (HBW) retains the "palm crow" as a single species with two subspecies.

Despite the Hispaniolan palm crow being sympatric with the white-necked crow (Corvus leucognaphalus) on Hispaniola, it appears to be more closely related to the fish crow (C. ossifragus) of the East Coast of the United States and as two smaller species, the Tamaulipas crow (C. imparatus) and Sinaloan crow (C. sinaloae) of Mexico, than to the white-necked crow. The white-necked is more closely related to the Cuban crow (C. nasicus) and the Jamaican crow (C. jamaicensis), the other two Caribbean corvids. This indicates two distinct arrivals of crows onto the island (with the ancestor of the two palm crows being a later arrival), and a resulting niche differentiation, similar to that of C. nasicus and C. minutus on Cuba.

The following cladogram is based on phylogenetic study of the Corvidae by Knud Jønsson and collaborators that was published in 2012.

- - - Hispaniolan palm crow, Corvus palmarum
    - Cuban palm crow, Corvus minutus
  - - Fish crow, Corvus ossifragus
    - - Sinaloa crow, Corvus sinaloae
      - Tamaulipas crow, Corvus imparatus

== Description ==
The Hispaniolan palm crow is 34 to 43 cm (13 to 17 in) long; two individuals weighed 229 and 258 g (8.1 and 9.1 oz). The sexes have the same plumage; males are slightly larger than females. Adults are entirely black with much purple-blue iridescence on the mantle and wing coverts when fresh and which becomes dull brownish black when worn. They have a dark brown iris, a black or blackish bill, and black or blackish legs and feet. Juveniles are overall duller than adults.

== Distribution and habitat ==
The Hispaniolan palm crow is found in several areas in Haiti and the western half of the Dominican Republic. It primarily inhabits pine forest in the island's mountains but also occurs in evergreen forest in the lowlands of Haiti and in dry to humid deciduous forest in both countries. In elevation it ranges from sea level to 3,000 m (9,800 ft) but is most common between 750 and 2,000 m (2,500 and 6,600 ft).

== Behavior ==
=== Movement ===
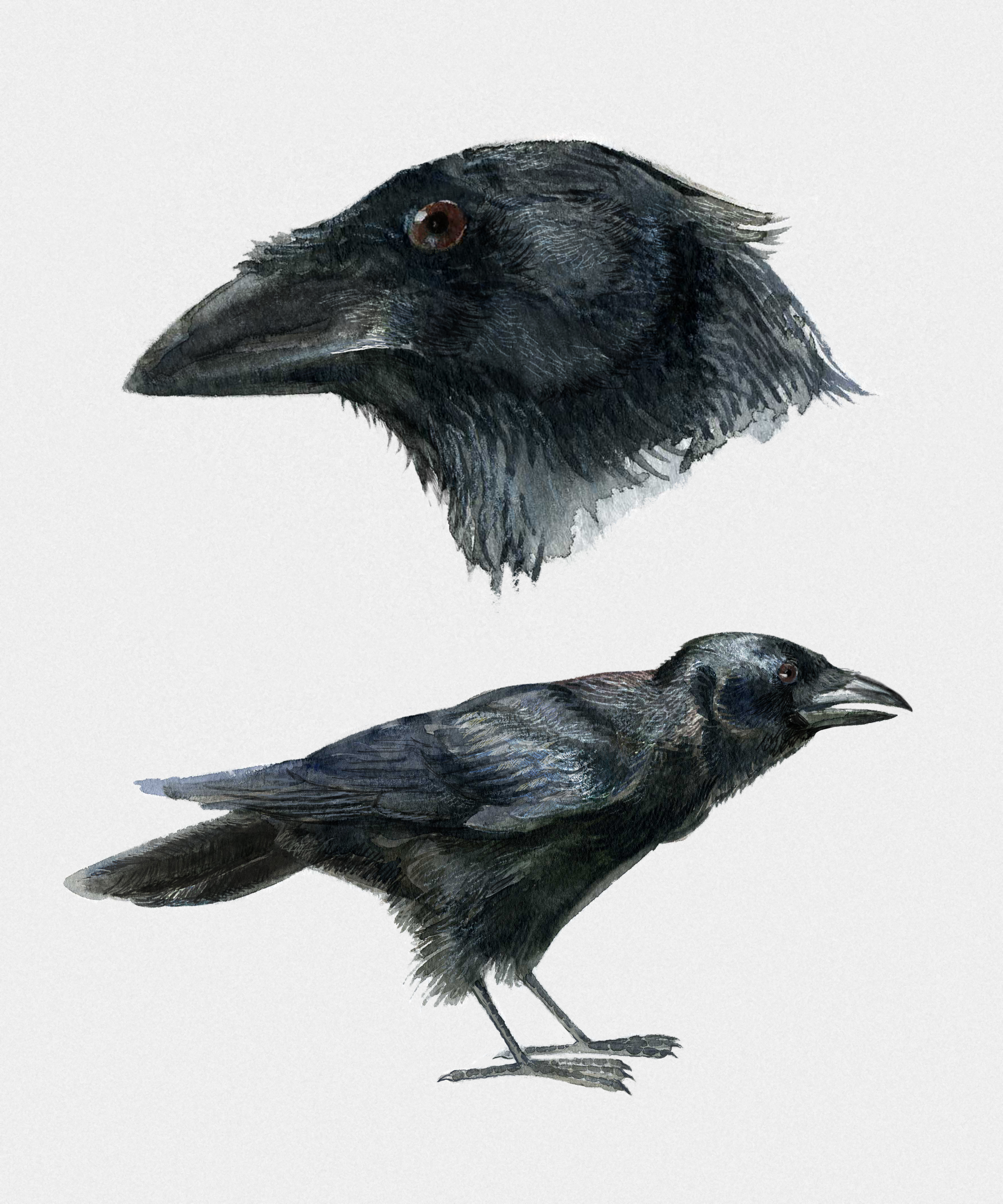
Illustration

The Hispaniolan palm crow is a year-round resident.

=== Feeding ===
The Hispaniolan palm crow is omnivorous. Though no detailed studies of its diet have been made, it is known to eat invertebrates like insects and snails, small vertebrates such as lizards, fruits, and seeds. It typically forages in pairs or in flocks of up to about 20 individuals, and uses all levels of its habitat.

=== Breeding ===
The Hispaniolan palm crow breeds between March and May. Its nest is a stick platform lined with grasses and other soft material. The clutch is three to four eggs that are pale green with brown and dark olive spots. The incubation period, time to fledging, and details of parental care are not known.

=== Vocalization ===
One of the Hispaniolan palm crow's calls is a "harsh, nasal aaar" with the vowels pronounced as in "fast". Another is "a double-noted cao cao" which provides the species' local Spanish name of "Cao". The species is noted for flicking its tail downwards while calling.

== Status ==
The IUCN follows HBW taxonomy and so has not separately assessed the Hispaniolan and Cuban palm crows. The palm crow's population size is not known and is believed to be decreasing. "On Hispaniola, its decline is a result of widespread forest clearance for agriculture and probably also hunting for food (it is reputedly a delicacy) and sport. It is more abundant on Haiti where gun ownership is lower." It is considered common in its range. It is found in two national parks in the Dominican Republic and one in Haiti. The species is listed as endangered on the Dominican Republic's national red list.
