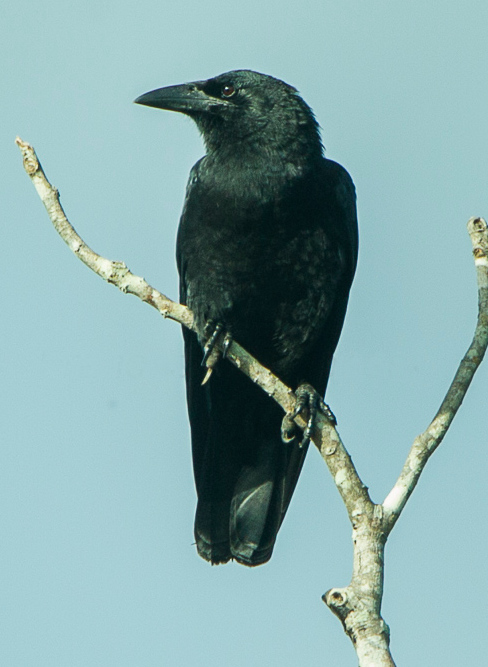
- Near Zapata Swamp, Cuba

Conservation status
- Least Concern (IUCN 3.1)

Scientific classification
- Kingdom: Animalia
- Phylum: Chordata
- Class: Aves
- Order: Passeriformes
- Family: Corvidae
- Genus: Corvus
- Species: C. nasicus

Binomial name
- Corvus nasicus Temminck, 1826
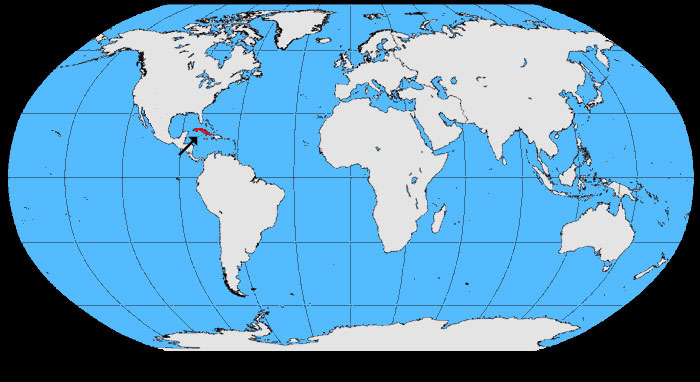
- Distribution map

= Cuban crow =

Species of bird

The Cuban crow (Corvus nasicus) is a crow species native to the northern Caribbean.

== Taxonomy ==
Two other Caribbean crow species, the white-necked crow (C. leucognaphalus) of Hispaniola and the Jamaican crow (C. jamaicensis), appear to be very closely related to it, sharing several key morphological features. The ancestor of the fourth and fifth species from this region, the Hispaniolan (C. palmarum) and Cuban palm crows (C. minutus), would appear to be a later arrival (at least in evolutionary terms); both species show more similarities to the fish crow (C. ossifragus) of mainland North America and two Mexican species. This is despite C. minutus being sympatric with C. nasicus on Cuba, indicating two distinct arrivals of crows onto the island, and a resulting niche differentiation, similar to C. leucognaphalus and C. palmarum on Hispaniola.

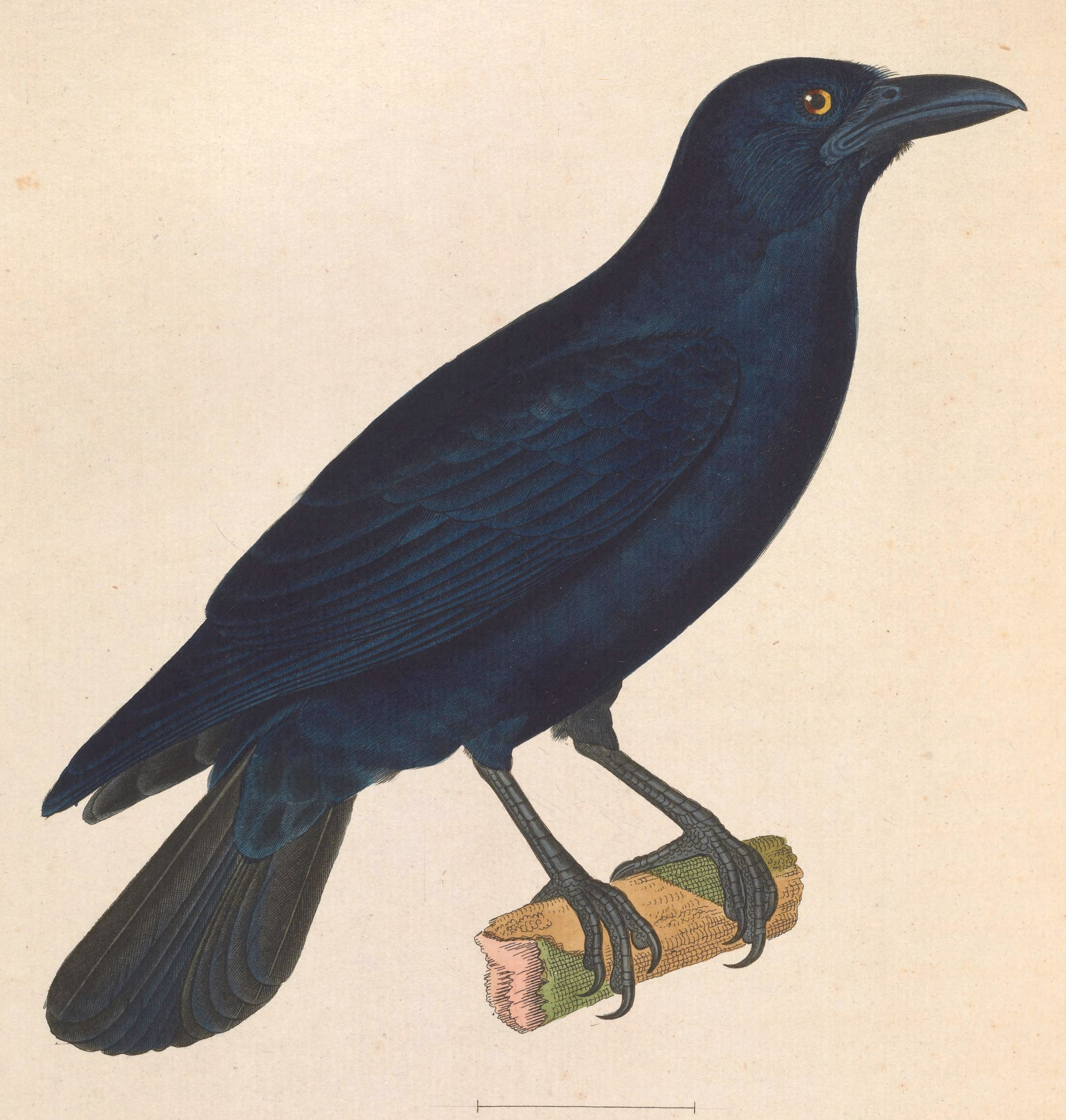
1838 illustration of Corvus nasicus

== Description ==
A stocky, medium-sized (40–42 centimetres or 16–17 inches in length) forest crow, the bill of this species is long and deep with a gentle curve towards the tip giving a large headed profile. The nasal bristles sweep forward then upward and frequently reveal the nostrils which are hidden in almost all other members of the genus Corvus. There is a patch of dark grey bare skin behind the browinsh-red eye and at the base of the lower mandible. The black plumage has a bluish-purple gloss in good light. The bill, legs and feet are black.

== Distribution and habitat ==
It can be found quite commonly over most of the island of Cuba and on the nearby Isla de la Juventud, as well as the Turks and Caicos Islands, in woodland and areas that have been cleared for agriculture. It is frequently found around farms and villages where it seems to have adapted quite well to living in relatively close contact with human settlements.

== Diet ==
Food consists of fruit and insects though it does appear to take human food readily and will scavenge for scraps where the opportunity arises. Large noisy flocks can be seen feeding in trees and it will also readily feed on the ground especially where grain and other seeds have been spilt or left unprotected on the surface of a field.

== Call ==
The voice is remarkably unlike that of any other crow, or corvid, with strange liquid bubbling notes and high ringing sounds produced in various combinations. It also produces a thin screeched "aaaaauh" that rises in inflection.

== Breeding ==
The nest is built in tall trees, though little further information about breeding is recorded as yet.

== Image links ==
- Good quality series of images
- Cuban Crow videos, photos & sounds on eBird
