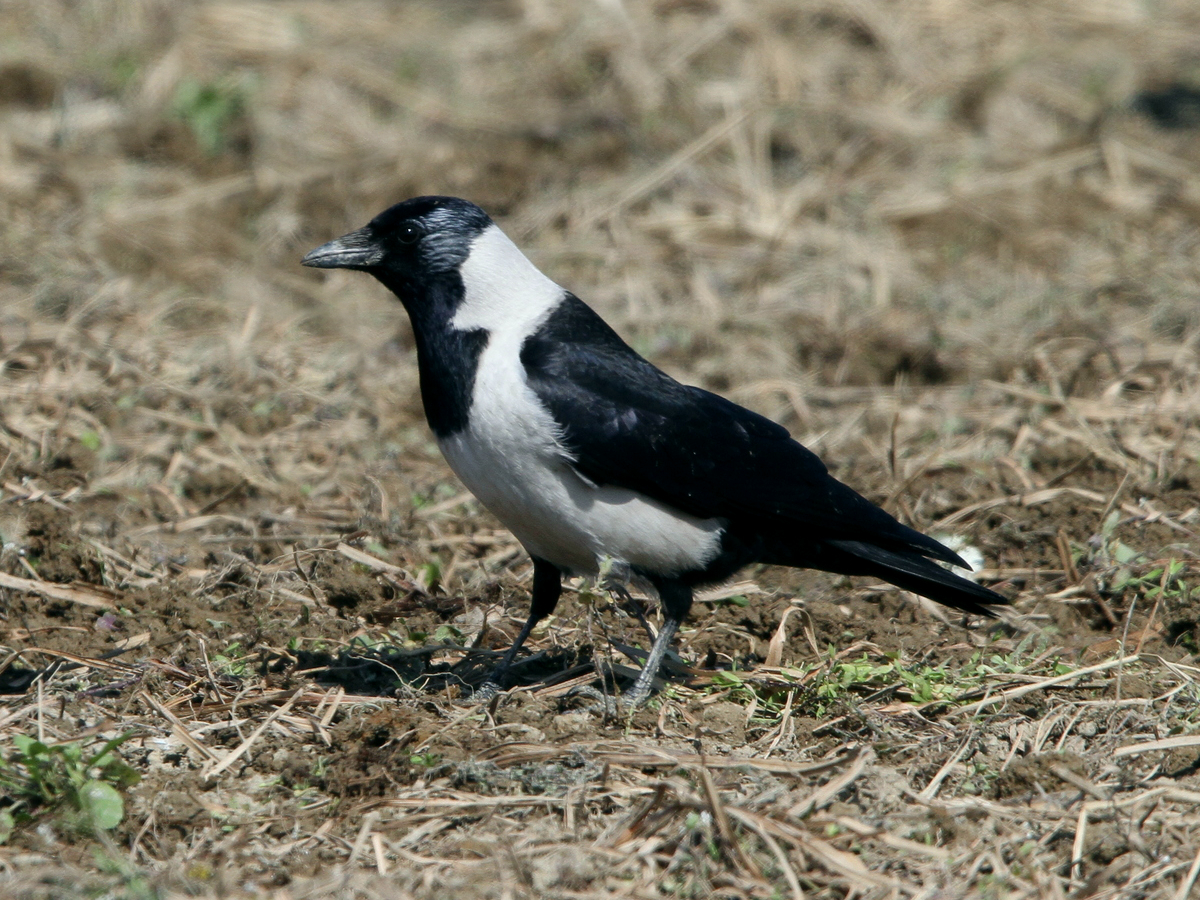
- Adult in Izumi, Kagoshima, Japan

Conservation status
- Least Concern (IUCN 3.1)

Scientific classification
- Kingdom: Animalia
- Phylum: Chordata
- Class: Aves
- Order: Passeriformes
- Family: Corvidae
- Genus: Coloeus
- Species: C. dauuricus

Binomial name
- Coloeus dauuricus (Pallas, 1776)
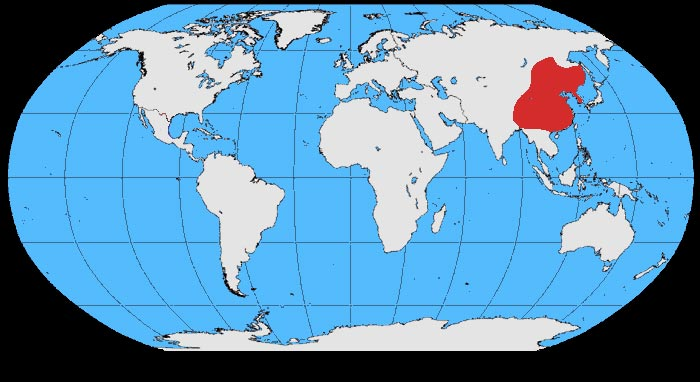
- Daurian jackdaw range

Synonyms
- Corvus dauuricus Pallas, 1776

= Daurian jackdaw =

Species of bird of the genus Coloeus

The Daurian jackdaw (Coloeus dauuricus) is a bird in the crow family, Corvidae, native to eastern Asia. It is closely related to the western jackdaw. The name derives from the Dauria region of eastern Russia.

== Description ==
Around 32 cm (13 in) in length, the Daurian jackdaw is about the same size as or slightly smaller than the western jackdaw, with the same proportions and identical habits. The principal difference lies in the plumage, but many adults have large areas of creamy white on the lower parts extending up around the neck as a broad collar. The head, throat, wings, and tail are glossy black and the ear coverts are grizzled grey. Darker adults and young birds resemble western jackdaws, though Daurian jackdaws have black irises, unlike the distinctive grey-white irises of the Eurasian jackdaw. The only other pied corvid species inhabiting the same region is the Chinese collared crow (Corvus torquatus), but as this is a much larger bird (about the same size or slightly larger than the carrion crow), confusion is unlikely to occur.

== Distribution and habitat ==
The Daurian jackdaw ranges from the southern part of eastern Siberia, south to Mongolia and throughout much of China. In the north of its range it migrates further south during the winter. It is a scarce winter visitor to Korea, a rare annual winter visitor to Japan, and a vagrant to Taiwan. There are a few records from Western Europe. It inhabits open woodland, river valleys, and open hills and mountains.

== Behaviour ==
It is a sociable species often found in association with rooks.

=== Feeding ===
Their diet is similar to that of the western jackdaw and includes cultivated grains, insects, berries, eggs, carrion, and faeces.

=== Breeding ===
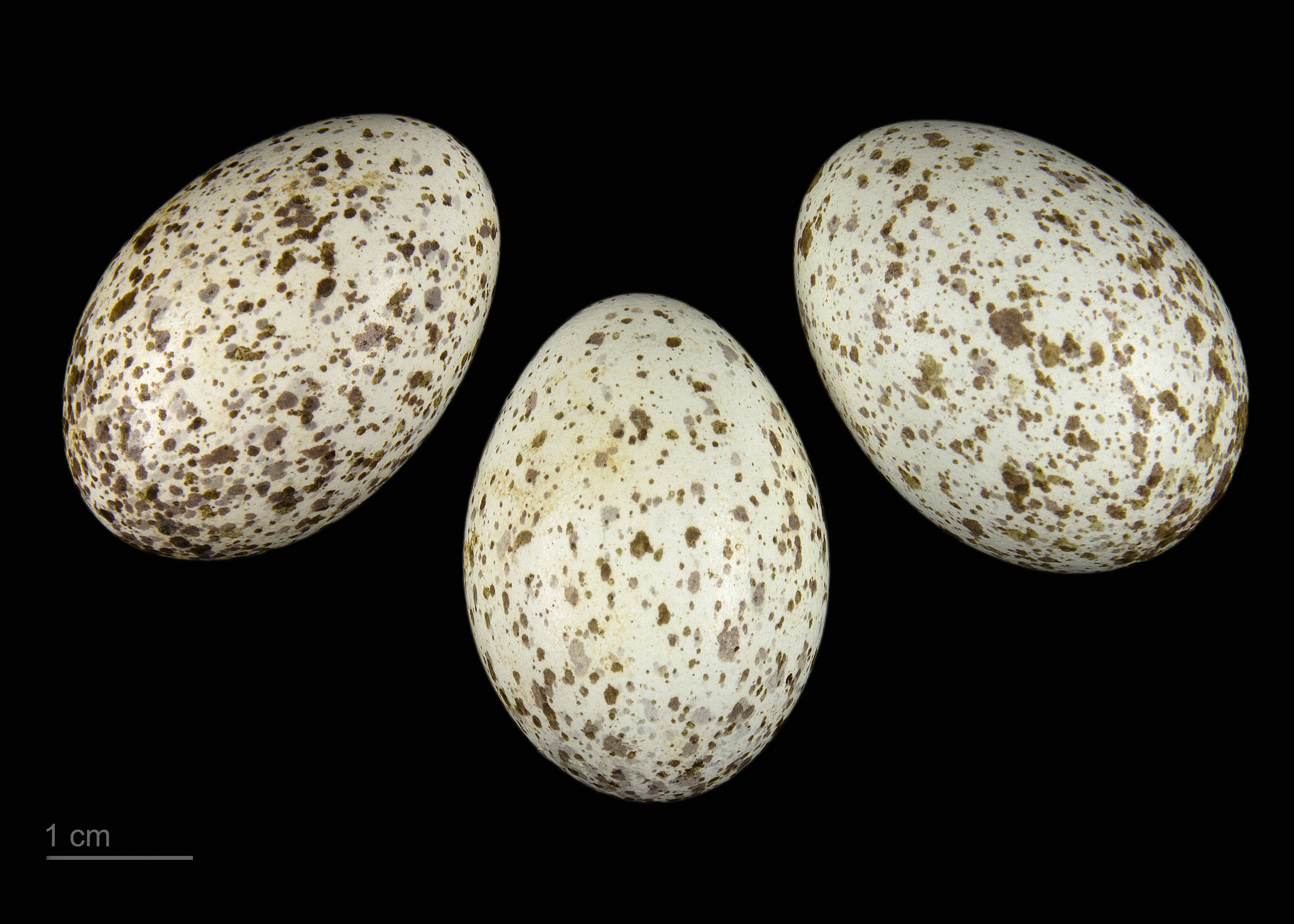
Coloeus dauuricus - (MHNT)

The species nests in trees where suitable cavities cannot be found, though tree hollows, rock openings, and ruined buildings are still favoured. The eggs are similar to those of the western jackdaw.
