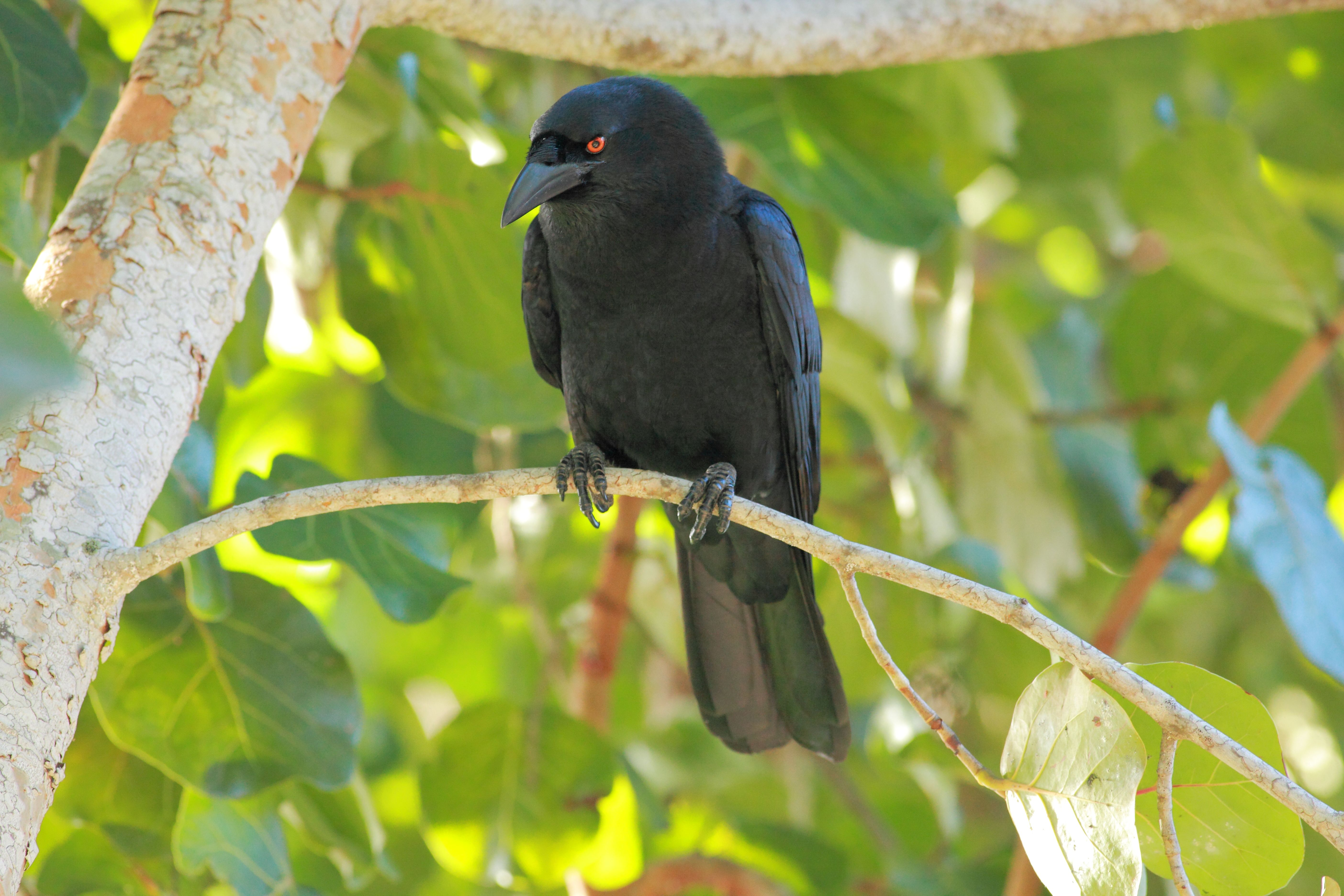
- Near La Romana, Dominican Republic

Conservation status
- Vulnerable (IUCN 3.1)

Scientific classification
- Kingdom: Animalia
- Phylum: Chordata
- Class: Aves
- Order: Passeriformes
- Family: Corvidae
- Genus: Corvus
- Species: C. leucognaphalus

Binomial name
- Corvus leucognaphalus Daudin, 1800
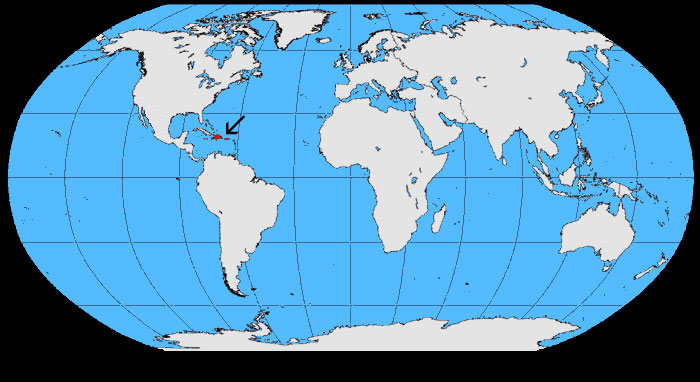
- Distribution map

= White-necked crow =

Species of crow endemic to Hispaniola

The white-necked crow (Corvus leucognaphalus) is the largest of the four Caribbean corvids. It is endemic to the island of Hispaniola (split between Haiti and the Dominican Republic); it was formerly also extant on Puerto Rico and Saint Croix in the United States Virgin Islands, but has been extirpated from both islands due to considerable forest clearance and hunting for meat.

== Taxonomy ==
Two other species, the Cuban crow (C. nasicus) and the Jamaican crow (C. jamaicensis), appear to be very closely related to it, sharing several key morphological features. The ancestor of the fourth and fifth species from this region, the Hispaniolan (C. palmarum) and Cuban palm crows (C. minutus), would appear to be a later arrival (at least in evolutionary terms); both species show more similarities to the fish crow (C. ossifragus) of mainland North America and two Mexican species. This is despite C. palmarum being sympatric with the white-necked crow on Hispaniola, indicating two distinct arrivals of crows onto the island, and a resulting niche differentiation, similar to C. nasicus and the Cuban palm crow (Corvus minutus) on Cuba.

== Description ==
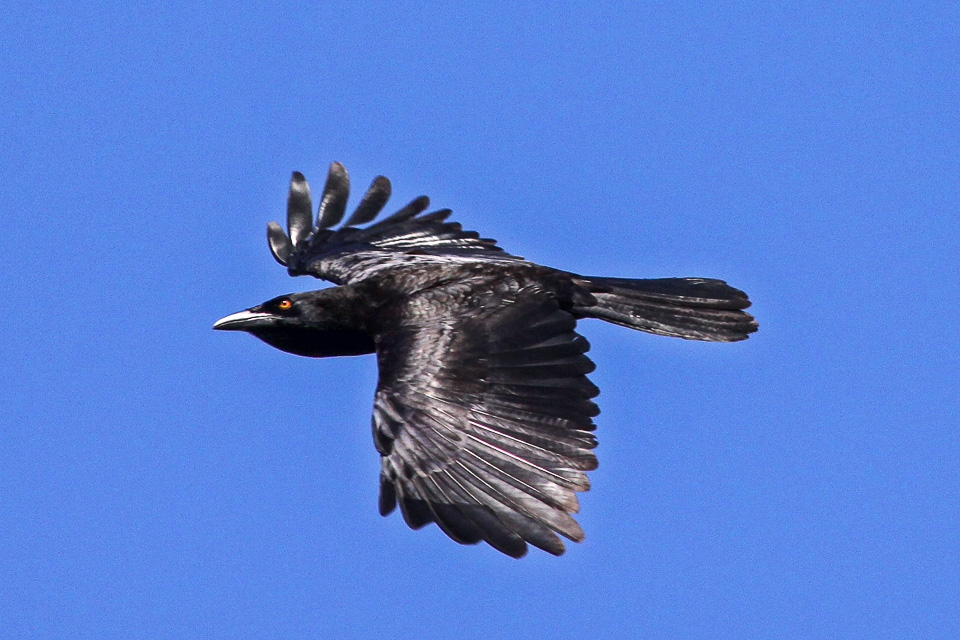
In flight at Laguna de Oviedo, Dominican Republic

A stocky bird, it is the largest Caribbean corvid, measuring 42–46 centimetres or 17–18 inches in length. The overall appearance is black, with a bluish-purple gloss in good light; despite the name, the neck typically appears entirely black, as the namesake white is restricted to the bases of the neck feathers, rarely visible in the field. The black bill is long and deep, and curves gently downward to the tip, giving the bird a large headed appearance. The nasal bristles do not quite cover the nostrils, unlike the majority of species in this genus. There is a patch of dark grey bare skin behind the eye, and the base of the lower mandible has a bare strip of the same coloured skin. The iris is a distinctive crimson red in colour, and the legs and feet are black. It often flies high over the forest canopy and soars on thermals, unlike the palm crow, which rarely, if ever, soars.

== Distribution and habitat ==
It inhabits both lowland and mid-elevation mountain forest on Hispaniola, and somewhat tolerates degraded areas used for agriculture, as well as some urban landscapes.

== Diet ==
The diet is typical of most forest crows, comprising a large amount of fruit but a degree of invertebrate food is also taken, especially when feeding young. Small vertebrate prey has also been found in the stomachs of collected birds, including small native toads and nestlings. Bird eggs are also taken when found.

== Reproduction ==
The nest is always solitary and built high in a tall tree, though little else concerning their breeding has as yet been recorded.

== Voice ==
Audio recordings of Corvus leucognaphalus on Xeno-canto.

The voice of the white-necked crow is quite remarkable and unusual for a corvid, described as sounding more like a parrot, and consists of a series of liquid bubbling sounds, squawking, and babbling, mixed with sweet and harsh notes, including some that sound like the common raven (Corvus corax). It has been known to imitate the crowing of roosters, as well as other sounds.

== Conservation ==
It has been designated as "Vulnerable" by the IUCN, due to having a severely fragmented population which is mostly decreasing, and several other threats (mainly hunting for both food and as a crop pest, lack of enforcement of conservation laws, possible spread of West Nile virus, destruction of habitat for agriculture and timber, capture for the pet trade, and attacks on nest sites by the recently arrived pearly-eyed thrasher, Margarops fuscatus); the same factors that led to its extirpation on Puerto Rico and Saint Croix seem to affect the remaining populations on Hispaniola and surrounding islands.
