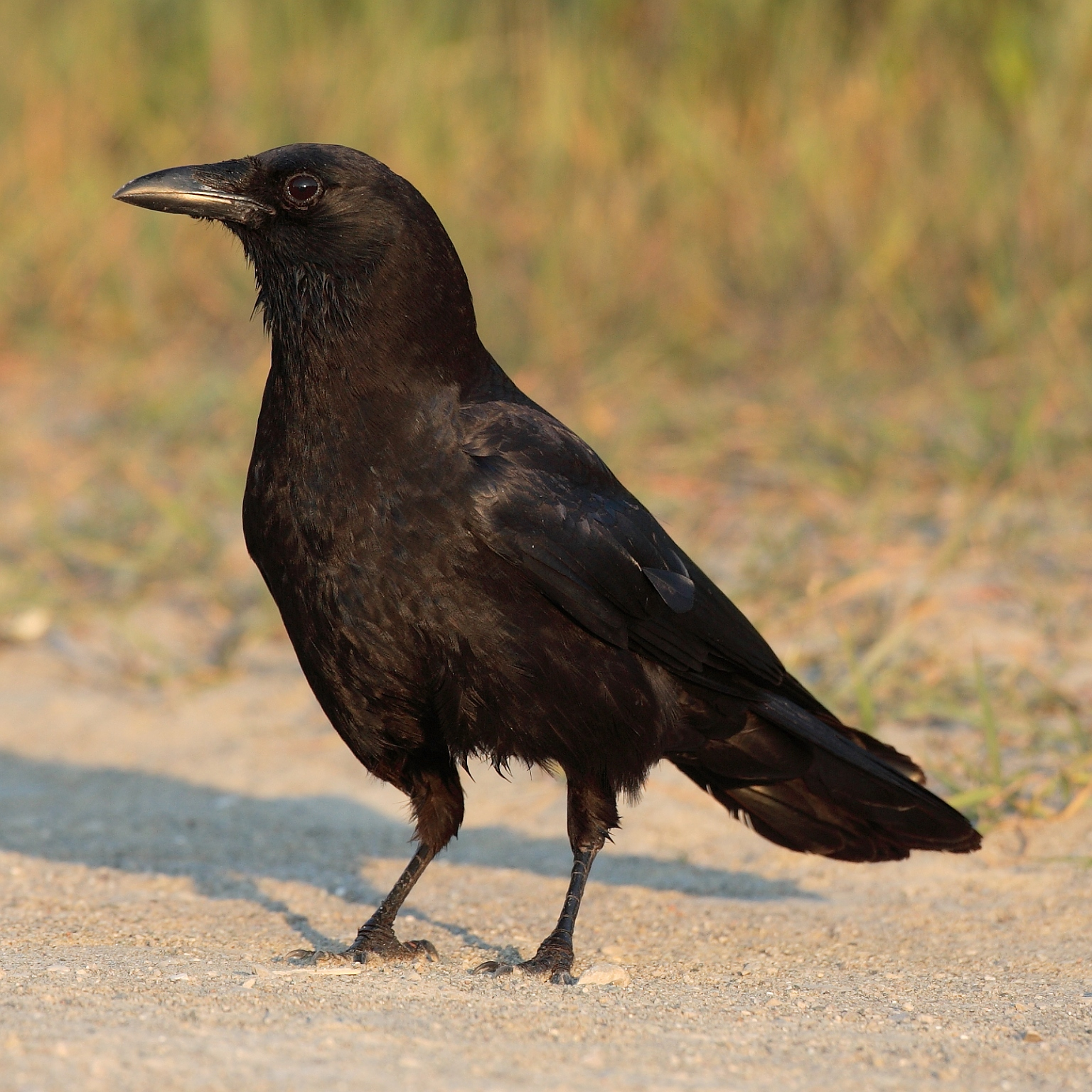
- American crow in Bruce Peninsula National Park, Ontario
- Sound (including rattling)

Conservation status
- Least Concern (IUCN 3.1)

- Secure (NatureServe)

Scientific classification
- Kingdom: Animalia
- Phylum: Chordata
- Class: Aves
- Order: Passeriformes
- Family: Corvidae
- Genus: Corvus
- Species: C. brachyrhynchos

Binomial name
- Corvus brachyrhynchos Brehm, 1822
- Range map Breeding Year-round Nonbreeding

= American crow =

Species of passerine bird

The American crow (Corvus brachyrhynchos) is a large passerine bird species of the family Corvidae. It is a common bird found throughout much of North America, only absent from the tundra biome. The American crow is the New World counterpart to the carrion crow and the hooded crow of Eurasia, occupying similar ecological niches.

The American crow has all-black plumage, with iridescent feathers. It looks similar to other all-black corvids. It is highly intelligent, similar to other Corvidae, and is adaptable to human environments.

The American crow can be distinguished from the common raven by its smaller size and a slightly less pronounced beak, and from the carrion crow by its size, as the carrion crow is larger and of a stockier build. The American crow can be difficult to distinguish from the fish crow; however, the fish crow tends to fluff its throat feathers when calling. The American crow is an omnivore, feeding on insects, seeds, and nuts while also preying on small animals. It also rarely feeds on carrion, leading to associations with death, thieves, and bad luck in some cultures; however, in Native American and some Gaelic cultures, crows are considered good luck due to their intelligence.

The American crow is common, widespread, and susceptible to the West Nile virus, making it a useful bioindicator for tracking the virus's spread. Direct transmission of the virus from crows to humans is impossible. According to BirdLife International, there are 31 million American crows as of 2012.

== Taxonomy and systematics ==
The American crow was described by German ornithologist Christian Ludwig Brehm in 1822. Its scientific name means literally 'short-billed crow', from Ancient Greek βραχυ- brachy- ('short-') and ρυνχος rhynchos ('billed').

A 2012 genetic analysis of the genus Corvus calculated that the American crow diverged from a lineage that gave rise to the collared, carrion, and hooded crows around 5 million years ago.

"American crow" has been designated the official name by the International Ornithologists' Union (IOU).

=== Subspecies ===
The number of subspecies varies by authority, ranging between three and five. The unclear taxonomy of the northwestern crow, previously its own species, has complicated subspecies determinations. Subspecies differ in bill proportion and form a rough NE–SW clinal in size across North America. Birds are smallest in the far west and on the southern coast.

- C. b. brachyrhynchos (Brehm, 1822) – eastern crow: northeastern United States, eastern Canada, and surroundings. The nominate subspecies, and largest.
- C. b. hesperis (Ridgway, 1887) – western crow: western North America except the Arctic north, the Pacific Northwest, and the extreme south. Smaller overall with a proportionally more slender bill and low-pitched voice.
- C. b. caurinus (Baird, 1858) – northwestern crow: of the Pacific temperate rain forests was formerly considered a distinct species as C. caurinus, averaging smaller in size than other American crows with a distinctly hoarser call. It forms a hybrid swarm with the American crow (sensu stricto) in coastal Washington and British Columbia. In 2020, the American Ornithological Society reclassified the Northwestern Crow as conspecific with the American Crow. It is now considered a geographic variation within C. b. hesperis.
- C. b. pascuus (Coues, 1899) – Florida crow: Florida. Mid-sized, short-winged, but decidedly long bill and legs.
- C. b. paulus (Howell, 1913) – southern crow: southern United States. Smaller overall, the bill is also small.

== Description ==
C. b. caurinus, Vancouver island, BC, Canada

Calling

The American crow is a large, distinctive bird with iridescent black feathers all over. Its legs, feet, and bill are also black. They measure 40–53 cm (16–21 in) in length, of which the tail makes up about 40%. The wing chord is 24.5 to 33 cm (9.6 to 13.0 in), with the wingspan ranging from 85 to 100 cm (33 to 39 in). The bill length can be from 3 to 5.5 cm (1.2 to 2.2 in), varying strongly according to location. The tarsus is 5.5 to 6.5 cm (2.2 to 2.6 in) and the tail is 13.5 to 19 cm (5.3 to 7.5 in). The body mass can vary from 316 to 620 g (11.1 to 21.9 oz). Males tend to be larger than females.

The most usual call is a loud, short, and rapid caaw-caaw-caaw. Usually, the birds thrust their heads up and down as they utter this call. American crows can also produce a wide variety of sounds and sometimes mimic noises made by other animals, including other birds, such as barred owls.

Visual differentiation from the fish crow (C. ossifragus) is extremely difficult and often inaccurate. Nonetheless, differences apart from size do exist. Fish crows tend to have more slender bills and feet. There may also be a small, sharp hook at the end of the fish crow's upper bill. Fish crows also appear as if they have shorter legs when walking. More dramatically, when calling, fish crows tend to hunch and fluff their throat feathers.

If seen flying at a distance from where size estimates are unreliable, the distinctly larger common ravens (C. corax) can be distinguished by their almost lozenge-shaped tail and their larger-looking heads. They also fluff their throat feathers when calling, similarly to fish crows. Ravens also soar for extended periods, unlike crows, which rarely fly more than a few seconds without flapping their wings.

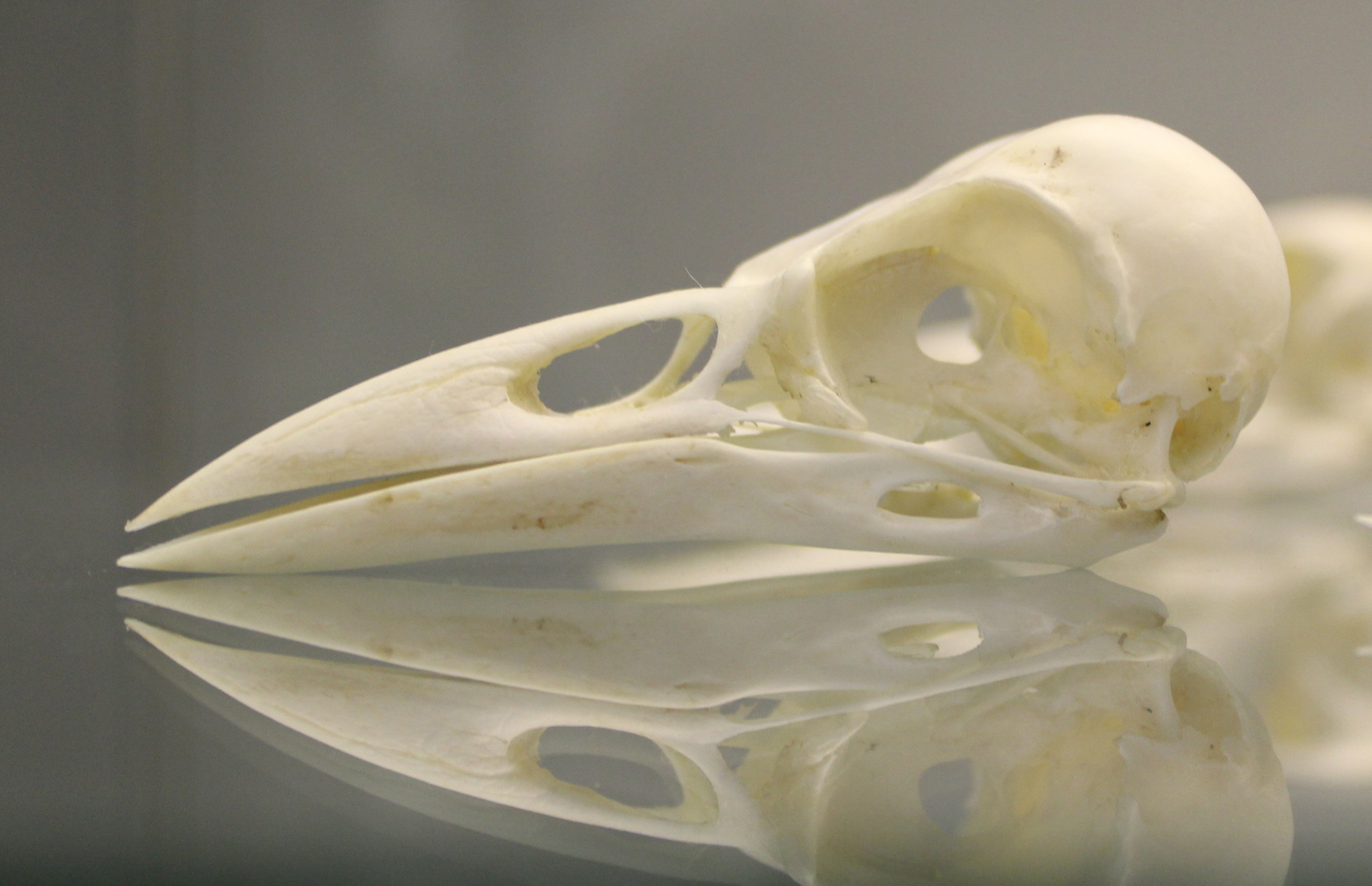
The skull of an American crow

Crows have been noted to be intelligent. They have the same brain-weight-to-body ratio as humans. This has led to some studies that have identified that crows are self-aware and that young crows take time to learn from tolerant parents. While a human has a neocortex, the crow uses a different area in its brain, the pallium, to perform similar tasks. They can remember and identify people based on their appearance.

The average lifespan of the American crow in the wild is 7–8 years. Captive birds are known to have lived up to 30 years. The West Nile virus is a major cause of death in crows.

=== Distribution and habitat ===
The American crow has a large range, extending from the Pacific Ocean to the Atlantic Ocean in Canada, on the French islands of Saint-Pierre and Miquelon, south through the United States, and into northern Mexico. They have also been recorded in Bermuda from 1876 onwards. The increase in trees throughout the Great Plains during the past century due to fire suppression and tree planting facilitated range expansions of the American crow as well as range expansions of other species of birds such as the barred owl. The American crow inhabits virtually all types of country – from wilderness, farmland, parks, and open woodland to towns and major cities – and is absent only from tundra habitat. The American crow is a permanent resident in most of the US, but most Canadian birds migrate some distance southward in winter. Outside the nesting season, these birds often gather in large communal roosts of thousands or even millions of crows at night.

== Behavior and ecology ==
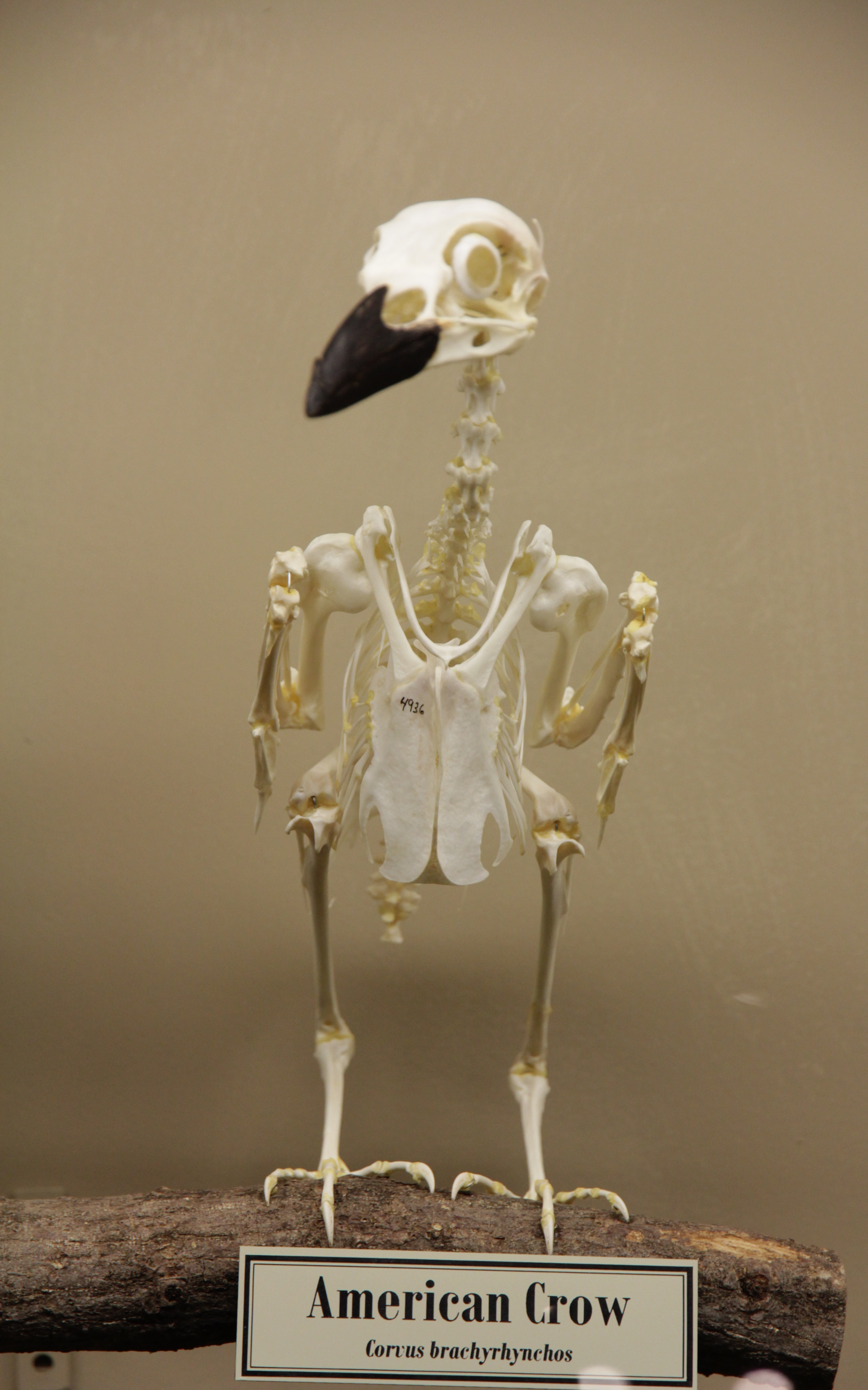
Skeleton (Museum of Osteology)

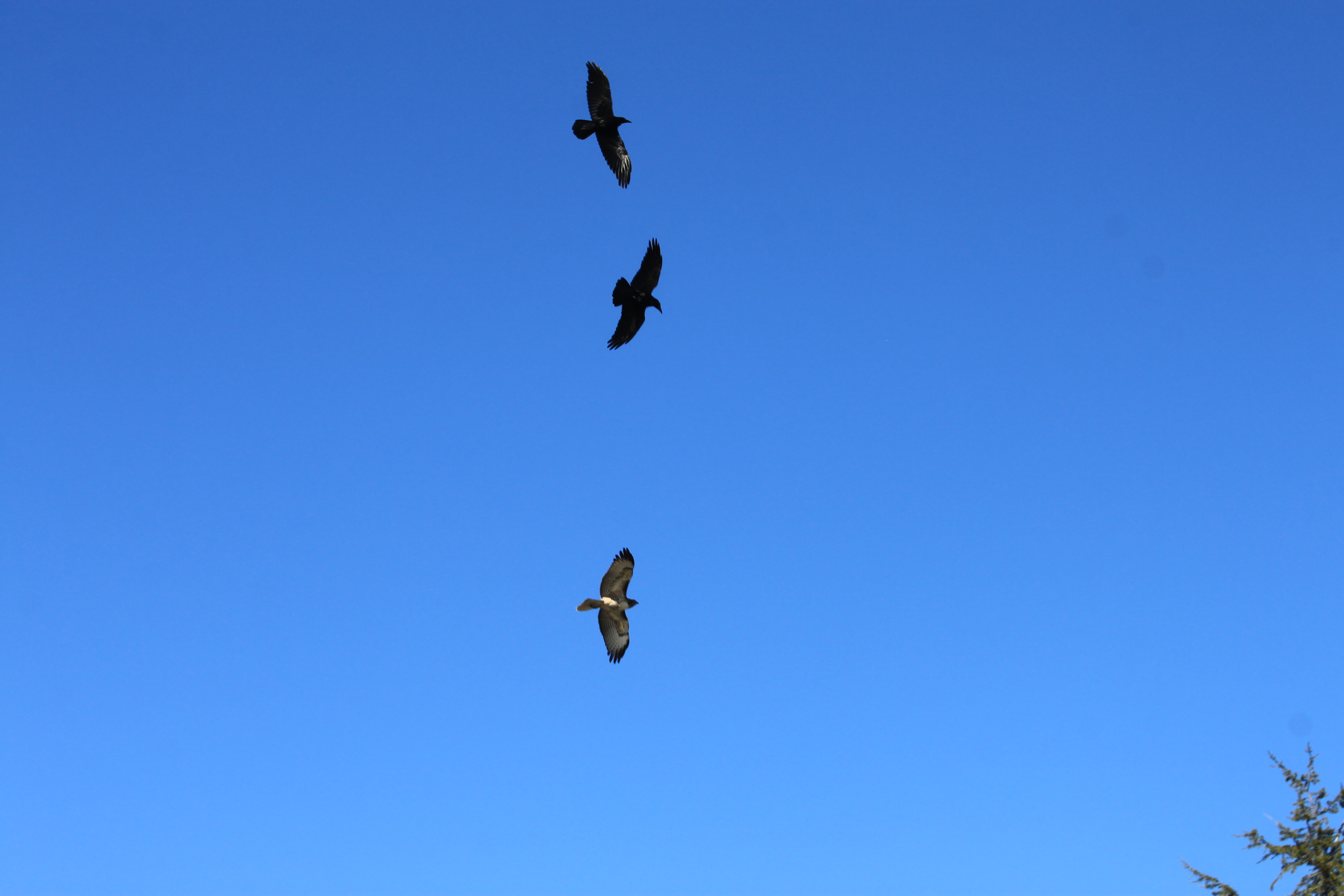
Pair of crows chasing away a red-tailed hawk from their nest

Studying the behavior of American crows is laborious due to the difficulty in catching them, resulting in much of their behavior, including daily routine, migration, molting, survivorship, age of first breeding, nestling development, and the nature of nesting helpers, being poorly studied.

=== Diet ===
The American crow is omnivorous. It will feed on invertebrates of all types, carrion, scraps of human food, fruits, nuts such as walnuts and almonds, seeds, eggs and nestlings, stranded fish on the shore, and various grains. American crows are active hunters and will prey on mice, young rabbits, frogs, and other small animals. In the winter and autumn, the diet of American crows is more dependent on nuts and acorns. Occasionally, they will visit bird feeders. The American crow is one of only a few species of birds that have been observed modifying and using tools to obtain food.

Like most crows, they will scavenge at landfills, scattering garbage in the process. Where available, corn, wheat, and other crops are a favorite food. These habits have historically caused the American crow to be considered a nuisance. However, it is suspected that the harm to crops is offset by the service the American crow provides by eating insect pests.

=== Reproduction ===
American crows are socially monogamous cooperative breeding birds. Mated pairs form large families of up to 15 individuals from several breeding seasons that remain together for many years. Offspring from a previous nesting season will usually remain with the family to assist in rearing new nestlings. American crows do not reach breeding age for at least two years. Most do not leave the nest to breed for four to five years.

The nesting season starts early, with some birds incubating eggs by early April. American crows build bulky stick nests, nearly always in trees but sometimes also in large bushes and, very rarely, on the ground. They will nest in a wide variety of trees, including large conifers, although oaks are most often used. Three to six eggs are laid and incubated for 18 days. The young are usually fledged by about 36 days after hatching. Predation primarily occurs at the nest site, and eggs and nestlings are frequently eaten by snakes, raccoons, ravens, and domestic cats. Adults are less frequently predated but face potential attack from great horned owls, red-tailed hawks, peregrine falcons, and both North American eagles. They may be attacked by predators such as coyotes or bobcats at carrion when incautious, although this is even rarer. American crows have been shown to be more wary of disturbances in urban environments. The American crow experiences inbreeding depression, yet research indicates they maintain a preference for such behavior.

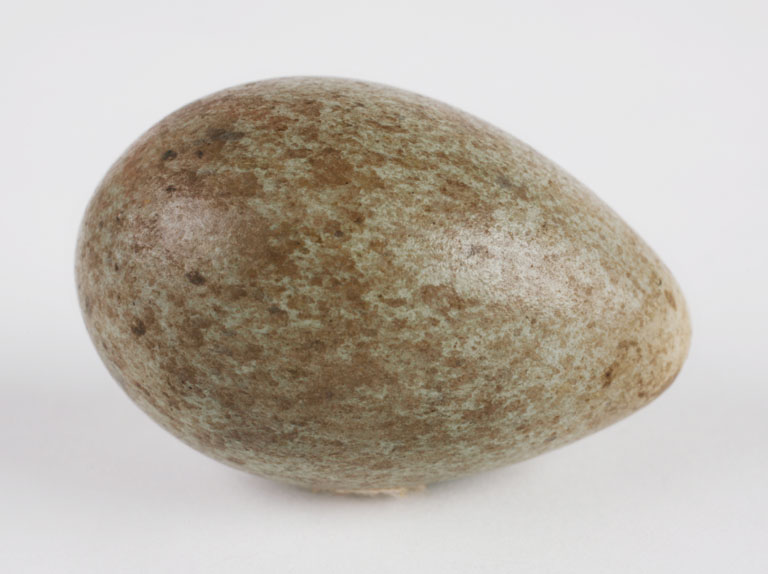
Egg, in the collection of the Children's Museum of Indianapolis

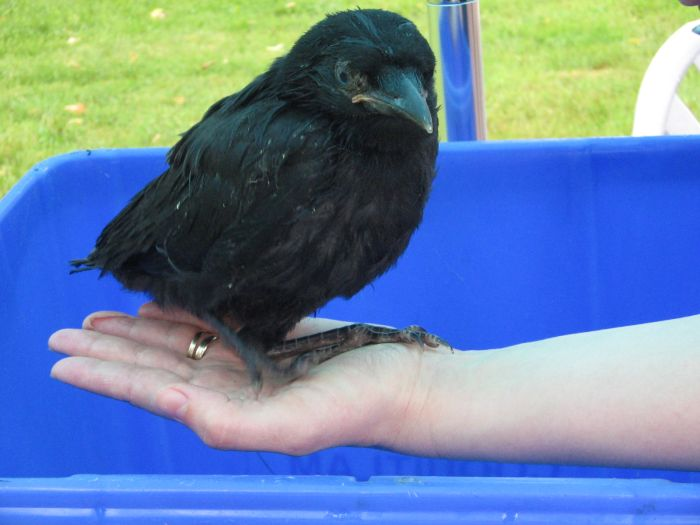
A fledgling, of the Northwestern subtype

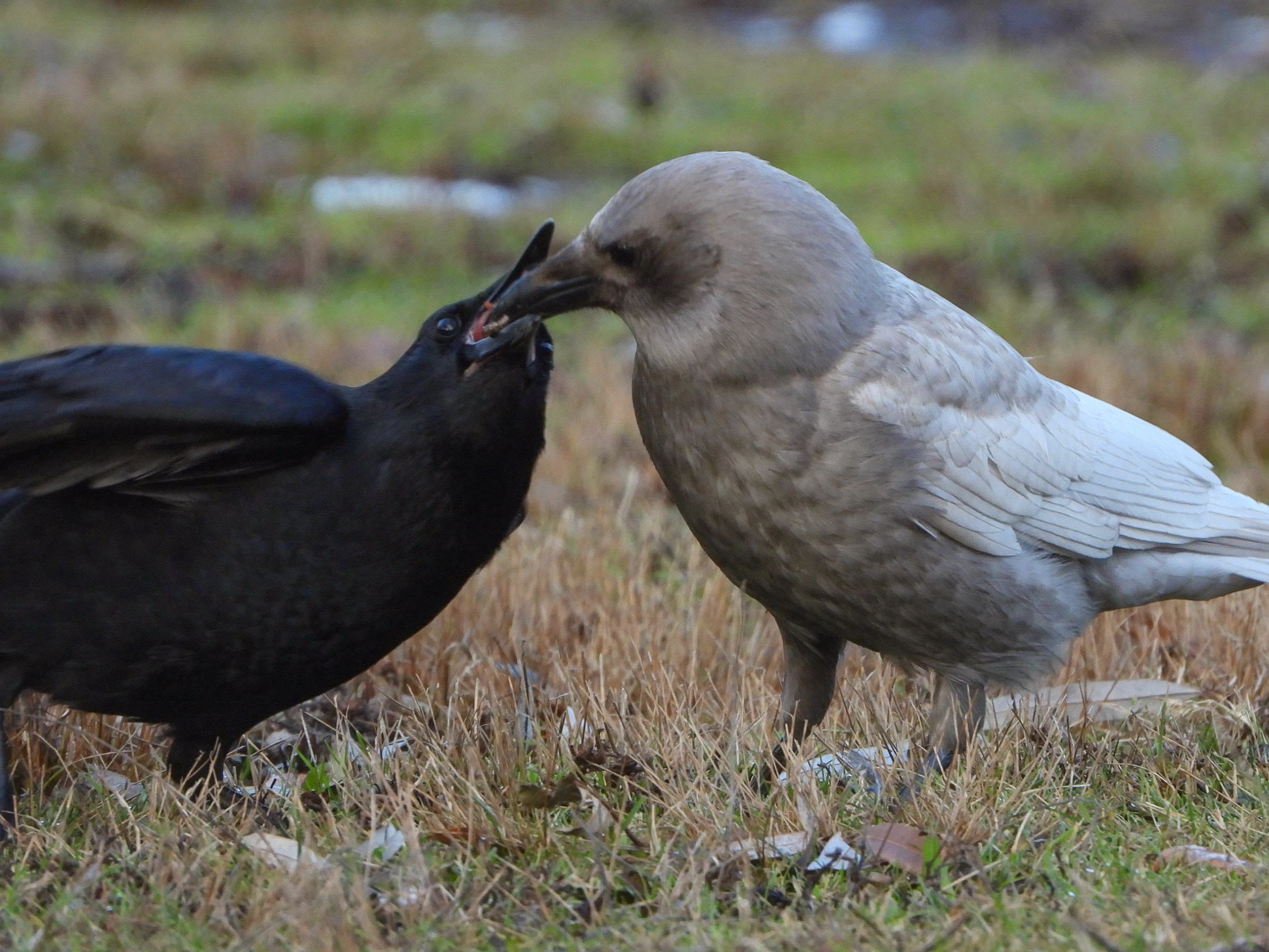
Leucistic crow feeding its offspring

=== West Nile virus ===
American crows succumb easily to West Nile virus infection. This was originally a mosquito-borne African virus causing encephalitis in humans and livestock since about 1000 AD. It was accidentally introduced to North America in 1999, apparently by an air traveller who was infected by a mosquito bite after arrival. It is estimated that the American crow population has dropped by up to 45% since 1999. Despite this decline, the crow is considered a species of least concern. The disease runs most rampant in the subtropical conditions that encourage reproduction of its mosquito vectors, among which Culex tarsalis is most significant. Mortality rates appear to be higher than those in other birds, causing local population losses of up to 72% in a single season. Because of this, American crows are a sentinel species indicating the presence of West Nile virus in an area. Crows cannot transmit the virus to humans directly.

=== Intelligence ===
American crows, like other corvids, are highly cunning and inquisitive. They can steal food from other species, often in creative ways. One example shows a group of crows stealing a fish from a Northern river otter: one bird pecked the otter's tail to distract it while other birds swooped in and stole the fish. American crows have been observed using and modifying tools; however, unlike the Hawaiian and New Caledonian crow, this behavior is not inherent. Female crows have been observed to be better at using tools, according to a 2023 study. American crows have also been noted for their ability to play, such as snowboarding using tree bark.

== Status and management ==
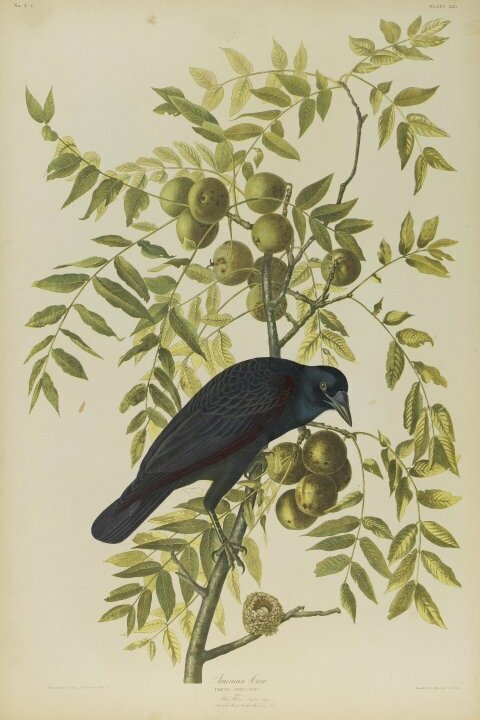
Brooklyn Museum – American crow – John J. Audubon

The intelligence and adaptability of the American crow have insulated it from threats, and it is instead considered an agricultural pest. In 2012, BirdLife International estimated the American crow population to be around 31 million. The large population and vast range result in the least concern status for the American crow, meaning that the species is not threatened with extinction.

Crows have been killed in large numbers by humans, both for recreation and as part of organized campaigns of extermination. In Canada, American crows have no protections, aside from Quebec, which bans their hunting during the nesting season. Laws on hunting vary throughout the United States. New Jersey allows for a limited hunting season, unless they are agricultural pests, in which case they may be killed. Oklahoma allows hunting even during the nesting season. In the first half of the 20th century, state-sponsored campaigns dynamited roosting areas, taking large numbers of crows. A campaign in Oklahoma from 1934 to 1945 dynamited 3.8 million birds. The effect on populations was negligible, and damage to crops did not decrease; thus, the campaign was halted due to its ineffectiveness. In a study taking data from 1917 to 1999, intentional killings were the overwhelming cause of death for crows, accounting for 68% of all recovered bird bands.

Non-deadly methods of managing crows are varied but usually limited in their effectiveness. High-value crops may be netted, but this is cost-prohibitive for most other crops. Frightening may be used to disperse crows, including loud noises from guns, fake hawks flown from balloons, fake owls that move with the wind, strips of reflective tape on fences, or recordings of crow distress calls. Crows quickly learn to avoid the less toxic baits, as the baits make crows sick. The actual effect of crows on agriculture has been poorly studied. There is some suggestion that they may be a benefit to farmers by eating insect pests and chasing off livestock predators like hawks.

== Role in human cultures ==
Crows are used as a motif in some human cultures, often associated with death, thieves, graveyards, bad luck, and other negative connotations. American crows are sometimes considered a pest, often due to their loud calls. However, in other cultures, like Native American folklore, crows are considered good luck, noted for their intelligence. Similarly, they are also seen by some neo-pagan and indigenous cultures as signs of good luck or even signs of certain gods, such as Apollo, Odin, and others. Crows are also featured in Aesop's Fables, in stories such as "The Crow and the Pitcher", and "The Fox and the Crow".

== Bibliography ==
- Goodwin, Derek & Gillmor, Robert (1976): Crows of the World (1st ed.). University of Washington Press, Seattle.
