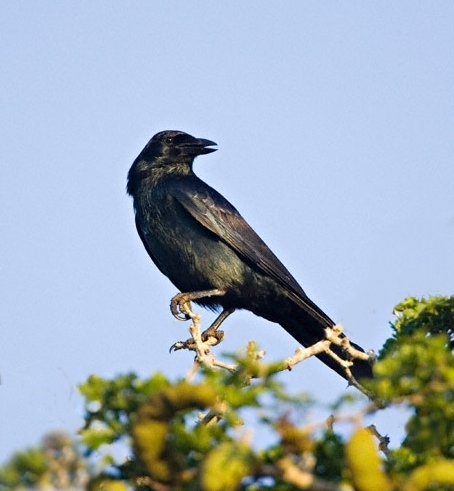

Conservation status
- Least Concern (IUCN 3.1)

- Secure (NatureServe)

Scientific classification
- Kingdom: Animalia
- Phylum: Chordata
- Class: Aves
- Order: Passeriformes
- Family: Corvidae
- Genus: Corvus
- Species: C. imparatus

Binomial name
- Corvus imparatus Peters, 1929
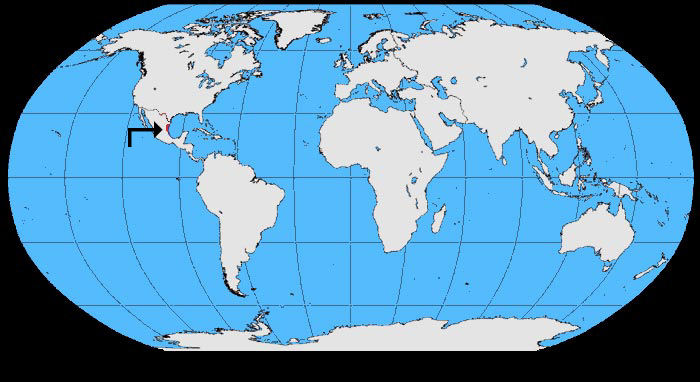

= Tamaulipas crow =

Species of bird

The Tamaulipas crow (Corvus imparatus) is a crow found in northeastern Mexico and southern Texas.

== Description ==
It is a relatively small and sleek looking crow, 34–38 centimetres (13–15 in) in length. It has very glossy dark, bluish plumage, which appears soft and silky. The bill is quite slender and black, as are the legs and feet. The Chihuahuan raven, a much larger and very different bird, is the only crow it commonly occurs alongside.

== Taxonomy ==
The Sinaloa crow (Corvus sinaloae) appears to be genetically extremely close to this bird and can be considered the western form of it though the voice is quite different, indeed a third species, the fish crow (Corvus ossifragus) of the southeastern United States appears to be very closely related to them also and the three may be considered a superspecies.

== Distribution and habitat ==
Occurring in a relatively small area in northeastern Mexico, it inhabits near desert scrub and bushland and includes farms, small towns and villages in its range. It also occurs in more humid woodland in open areas but does not appear to be found in the higher mountains or along the seashore. It is a sociable bird often forming large flocks, moving together in close groups. Its northern range reaches Brownsville in southern Texas where it has been known to nest.

== Behaviour ==
=== Diet ===
Food would appear to be mainly insects taken on the ground though eggs and nestlings are taken in trees as well as many fruits and berries.

=== Nesting ===
The nest is similar to the American crow but smaller and is built in a tree or large bush.

=== Voice ===
The voice of this crow is unusual and unlike most other species of the genus Corvus. It has a low croaking sound rather like a frog and a call that is described as a soft "gar-lik".
