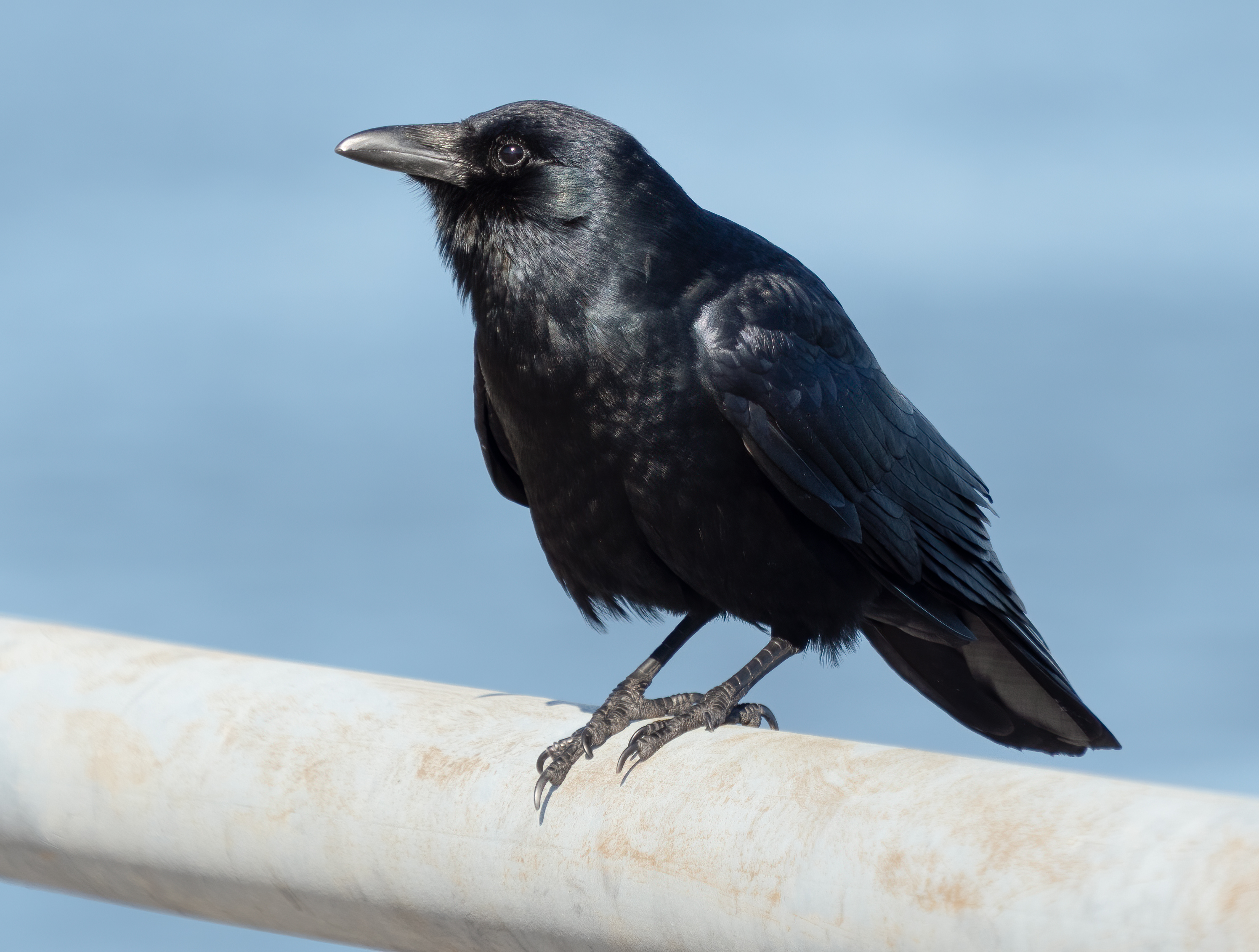
- In Red Hook, Brooklyn

Conservation status
- Least Concern (IUCN 3.1)

- Secure (NatureServe)

Scientific classification
- Kingdom: Animalia
- Phylum: Chordata
- Class: Aves
- Order: Passeriformes
- Family: Corvidae
- Genus: Corvus
- Species: C. ossifragus

Binomial name
- Corvus ossifragus Wilson, 1812
- Former fish crow range, before 21st century expansion

= Fish crow =

Species of bird

The fish crow (Corvus ossifragus) is a species of crow associated with wetland habitats in the eastern and southeastern United States.

== Taxonomy and etymology ==
The fish crow was given its binomial name by the Scottish ornithologist Alexander Wilson in 1812, in the fifth volume of his American Ornithology. The binomial is from Latin; Corvus means "raven", while ossifragus means "bone-breaker". It is derived from os or ossis, meaning "bone", and frangere, meaning "to break". The English-language common name fish crow also derives from Wilson, who ascribed the name to the crow's aquatic diet, as described to him by local fishermen. He distinguished the fish crow from John Bartram's great seaside crow by the former's diminutive size when compared to the American crow.

The fish crow's taxonomic relation to other species of the Corvus genus is still poorly understood, but DNA sequencing indicates that it is most closely related to the Hispaniolan palm crow (C. palmarum) and the Jamaican crow (C. jamaicensis), with the three species forming a Nearctic clade. The Sinaloa crow (C. sinaloae) and Tamaulipas crow (C. imparatus) bear morphological similarities to and were once considered conspecific subspecies of the fish crow, but have since been recognized as distinct species.

== Description ==
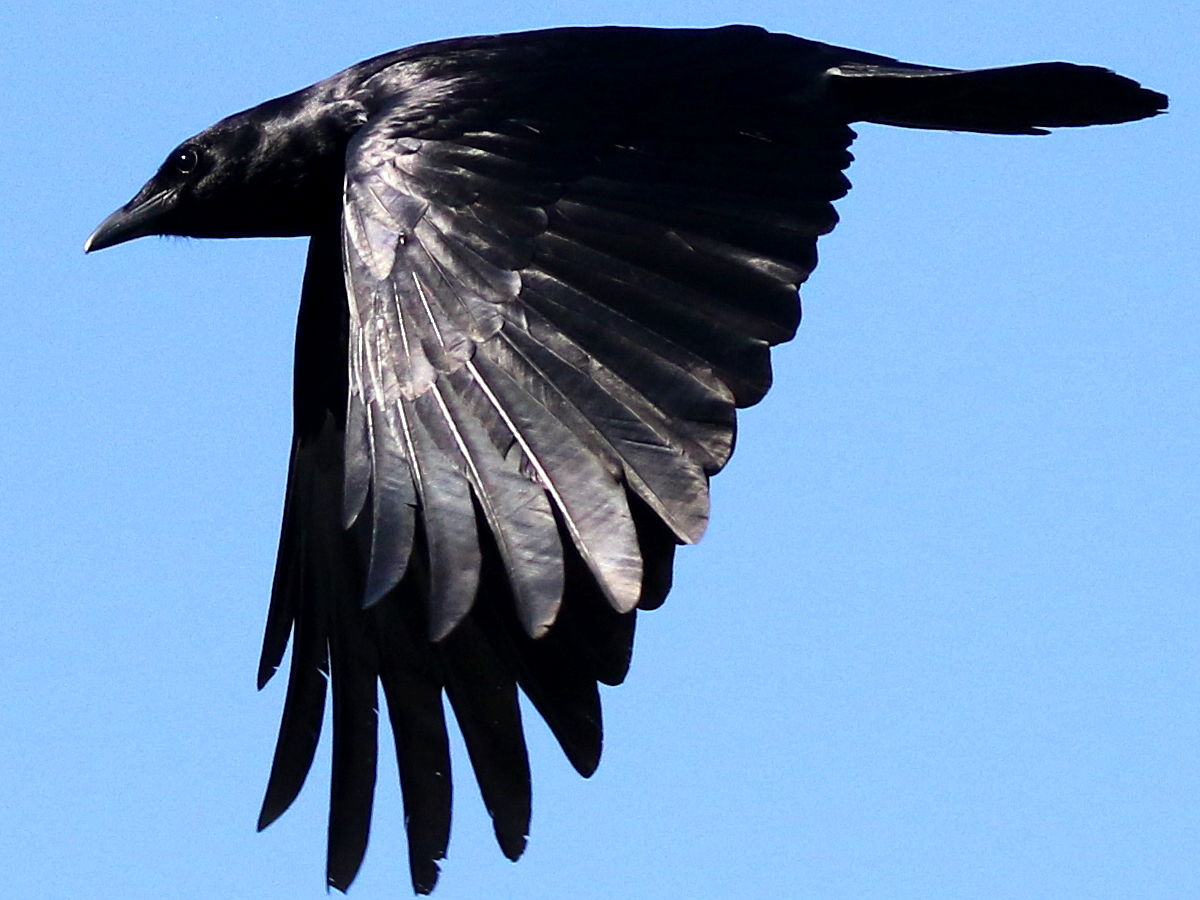
In flight Cape May Point State Park, New Jersey

The fish crow is a medium-large bird, with an average adult weight of 280–320 grams (9.9–11.3 oz) in males and 247–293 grams (8.7–10.3 oz) in females. The wingspan is approximately 36 inches (90 cm), while the total body length is between 36–40 centimetres (14–16 in).

The fish crow is superficially similar to the American crow, but is smaller and has a silkier, smoother plumage by comparison, and the bill is usually somewhat slimmer. The upperparts have a blue or blue-green sheen, while the underparts have a more greenish tint to the black. The eyes are dark brown. The differences are often only really apparent between the two species when seen side by side or when heard calling.

Visual differentiation from the American crow is extremely difficult and often inaccurate. Nonetheless, differences apart from size do exist. Fish crows tend to have more slender bills and feet. There may also be a small sharp hook at the end of the upper bill. Fish crows also appear as if they have shorter legs when walking. More dramatically, when calling, fish crows tend to hunch and fluff their throat feathers.

The voice is the most outwardly differing characteristic for this species and other American crow species. The call of the fish crow has been described as a nasal "ark-ark-ark" or a begging "waw-waw". Birders often distinguish the two species (in areas where their range overlaps) with the mnemonic aid "Just ask him if he is an American crow. If he says 'no', he is a fish crow", referring to the fact that the most common call of the American crow is a distinct "caw caw", while that of the fish crow is a nasal "nyuh unh". The fish crow also has a single call sounding like "cahrrr".

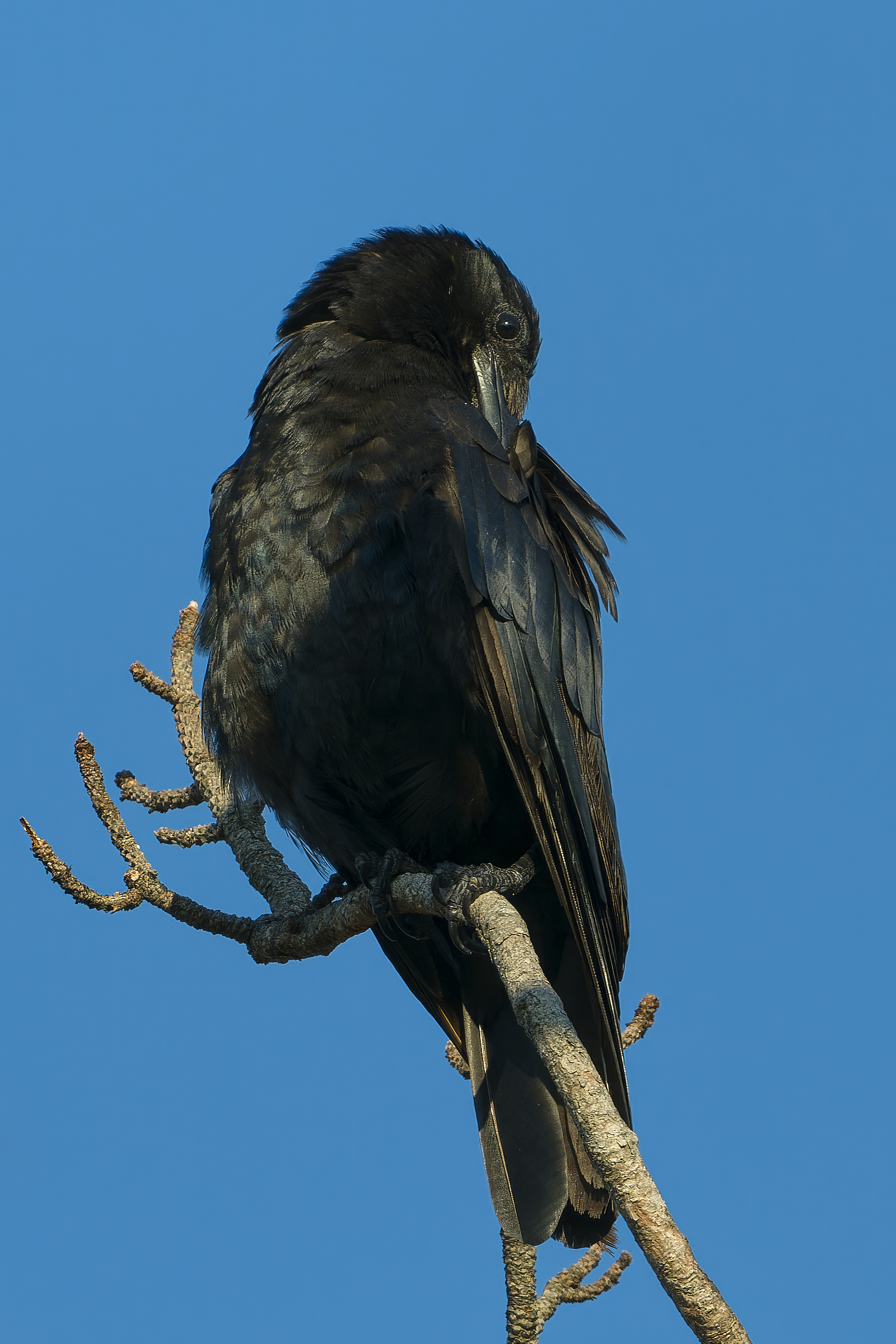
Blue-green sheen visible on feathers

== Distribution and habitat ==
This species occurs on the eastern seaboard of the United States from Maine south to Key West, and west along the northern coastline of the Gulf of Mexico. Coastal marshes and beaches, rivers, inland lakes and marshes, river banks, and the land immediately surrounding all are frequented. Fish crows are also found along many river systems inland for quite some distance, having expanded their range along rivers since the early 1900s. Since 2012, fish crows have rapidly expanded into Canada, with breeding populations along Lake Ontario. They have also been documented to be vagrant to the Bahamas, with populations in islands like Grand Bahama and Abaco.

== Behavior ==
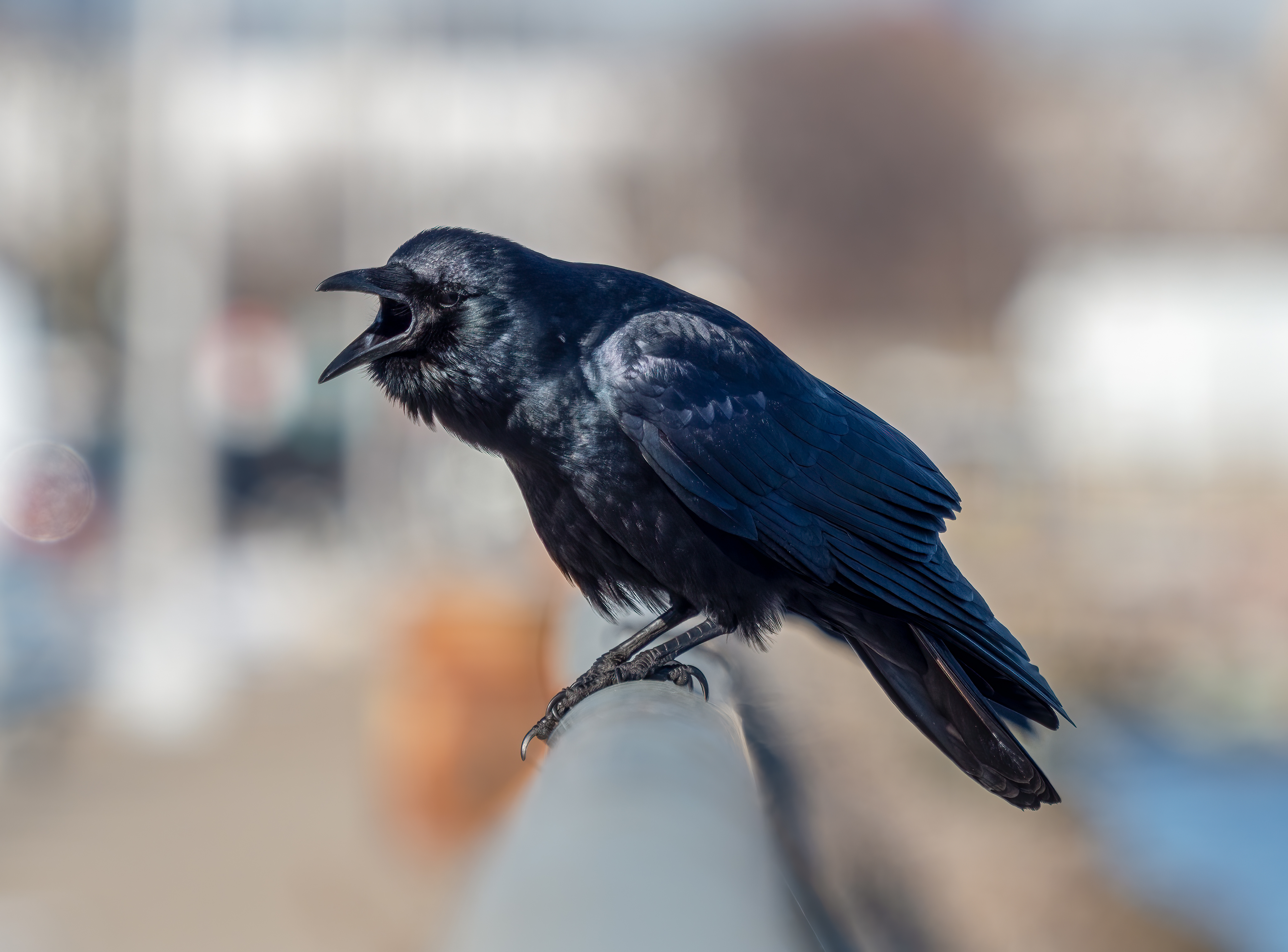
Fish crow while vocalizing

=== Diet ===
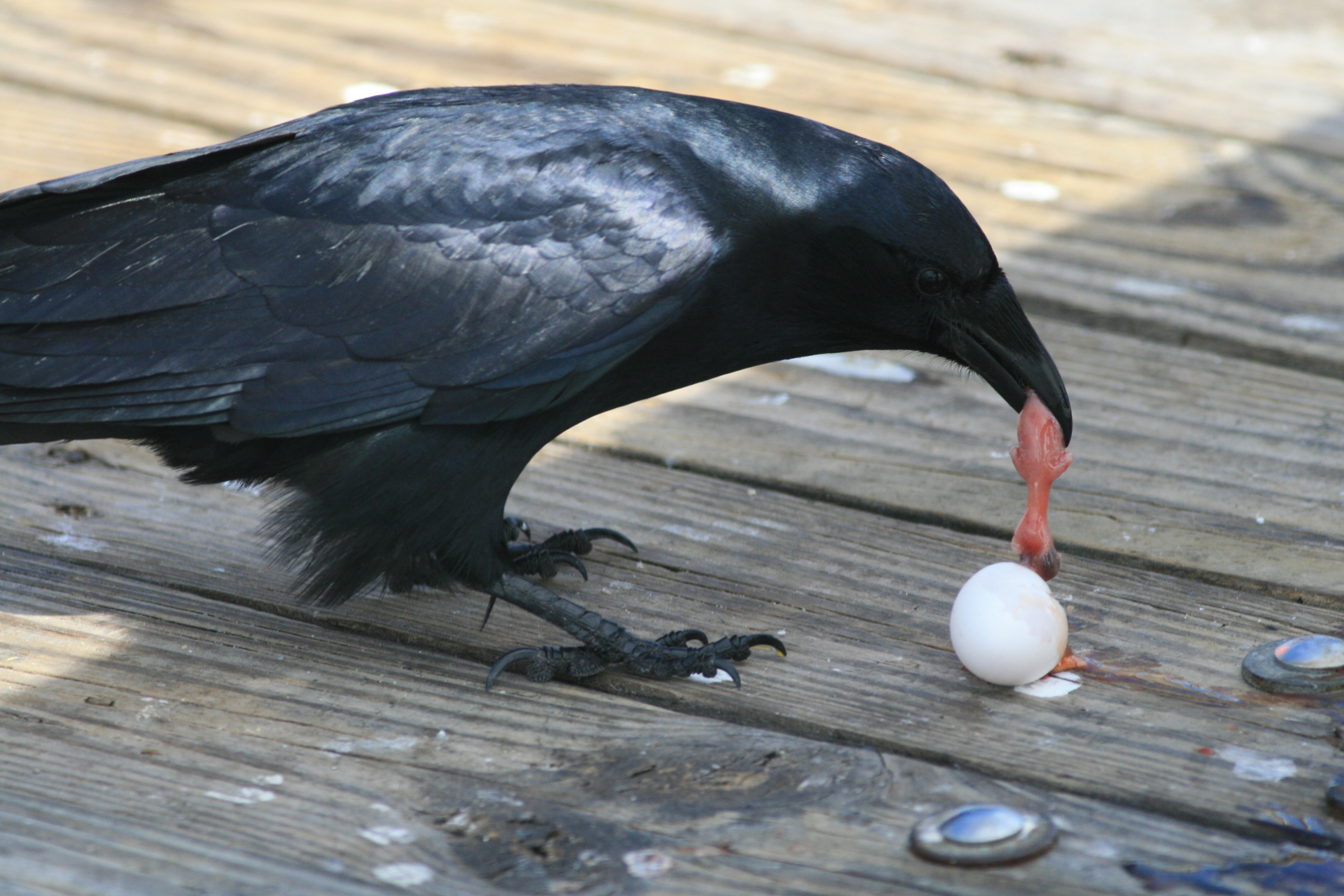
Fish crow eating an egg

Food is taken mainly from the ground or shallow water where the bird hovers and plucks food items out of the water with its feet. The fish crow is omnivorous. It feeds on small crustaceans, such as crabs and shrimps, other invertebrates, stranded fish, and live fish if the situation favors their capture, eggs and nestlings of birds, small reptiles, the fruits of many trees, peanuts, and grains, as well as human scraps where available.

=== Breeding ===
The nest is usually built high in a tree and is often accompanied in nearby trees with other nests of the same species forming small, loose colonies. The fish crow, however, is not strictly colonial, but will nest within 100 yards of each other, particularly where nest trees are scarce, such as in marshes. Depending on what trees are available, the birds put their nests near the top of evergreens, deciduous trees, palms, and mangroves. They are also known to raid heron nests and nest in heron colonies.

Usually, four or five eggs are laid. Pale blue-green in colour, they bear blotches of olive-brown. Fish crows build a new nest for each breeding attempt. A pair of fish crows were reported to have raised a young blue jay for multiple weeks.

== Conservation ==
This species appears to be somewhat more resistant to West Nile virus than the American crow. Survival rates of up to 45% have been reported for fish crows, compared with near zero for American crows.
