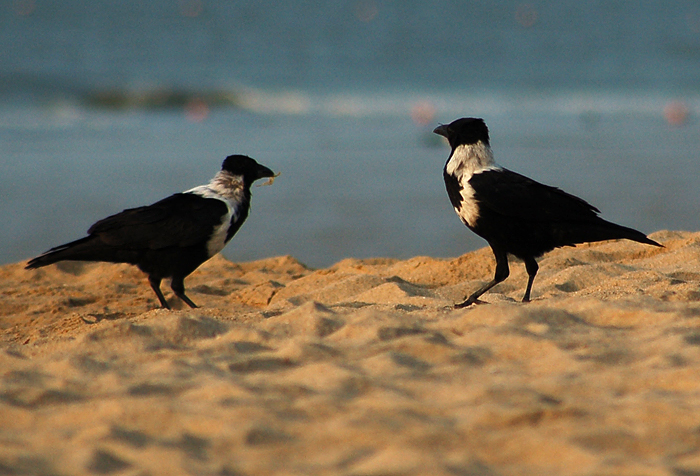

Conservation status
- Vulnerable (IUCN 3.1)

Scientific classification
- Kingdom: Animalia
- Phylum: Chordata
- Class: Aves
- Order: Passeriformes
- Family: Corvidae
- Genus: Corvus
- Species: C. torquatus

Binomial name
- Corvus torquatus Lesson, 1831
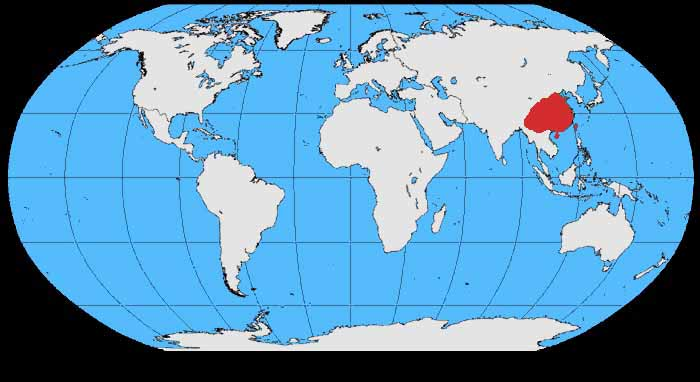
- Global range

Synonyms
- Corvus pectoralis Gould, 1836

= Collared crow =

Species of bird

The collared crow (Corvus torquatus), also known as the ring-necked crow or white-collared crow, is a member of the family Corvidae native to China and the north of Vietnam.

== Description ==
It is about 52–55 cm in length—the same size or slightly larger than the carrion crow (C. corone), with proportionately slightly longer wings, tail, and bill. A sleek and handsome bird, it has glossy black plumage except for the back of the neck, upper back (mantle), and a broad band around the lower breast that is white. The bill, legs, and feet are black.

It sometimes flies with its feet hanging down below the body in a characteristically "lazy" way.

The voice is a loud kaaar repeated several times with other slight variations on it to suit the occasion. It also, like many other corvids, utters strange clipping and clicking sounds during its head-bowing display to another bird.

== Distribution and ecology ==
The range of this species is essentially China, covering large areas of the country, though not further north than Beijing. It occurs in plains and low-lying river valleys in fairly open country and cultivated regions and is a common sight in paddy fields. It tends to avoid large towns and cities and is predominantly a rural species.

Food is sought mainly on the ground, where a large range of items are taken, such as insects, mollusks and other invertebrates (even from shallow water), and grains, especially rice, and it also searches among refuse for suitable food items left by humans. It appears to take less carrion than other species but will if the opportunity arises, and will also take eggs and nestlings.

The nest is usually in a tree and is plastered with mud. Usually, three or four eggs are laid.

It was classified as least concern by the International Union for the Conservation of Nature in 2004 before being upgraded to near threatened status in 2008. It is considered a vulnerable species as of 2018.
