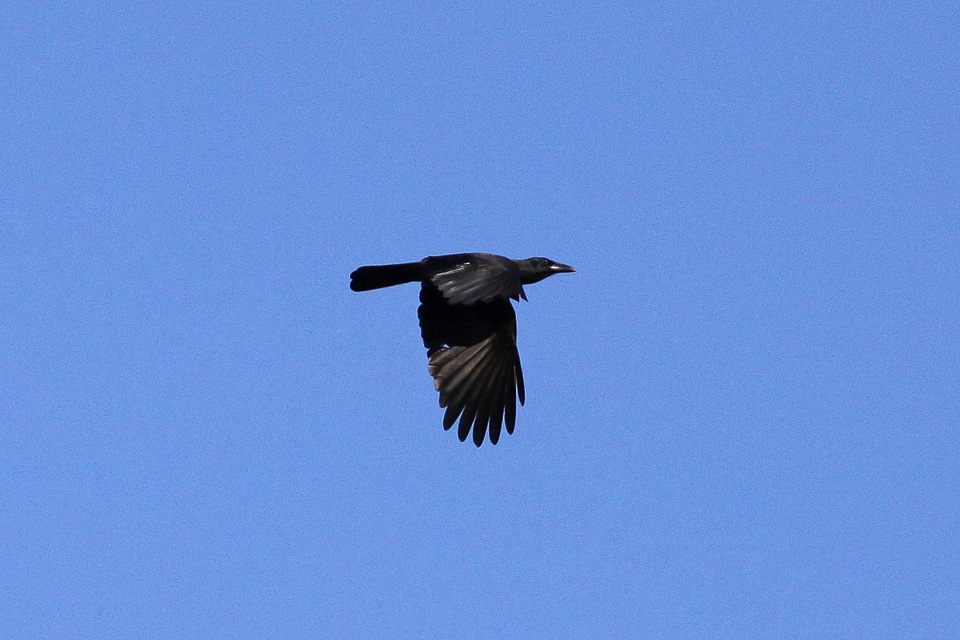
- In flight, near Cockpit Country, Jamaica
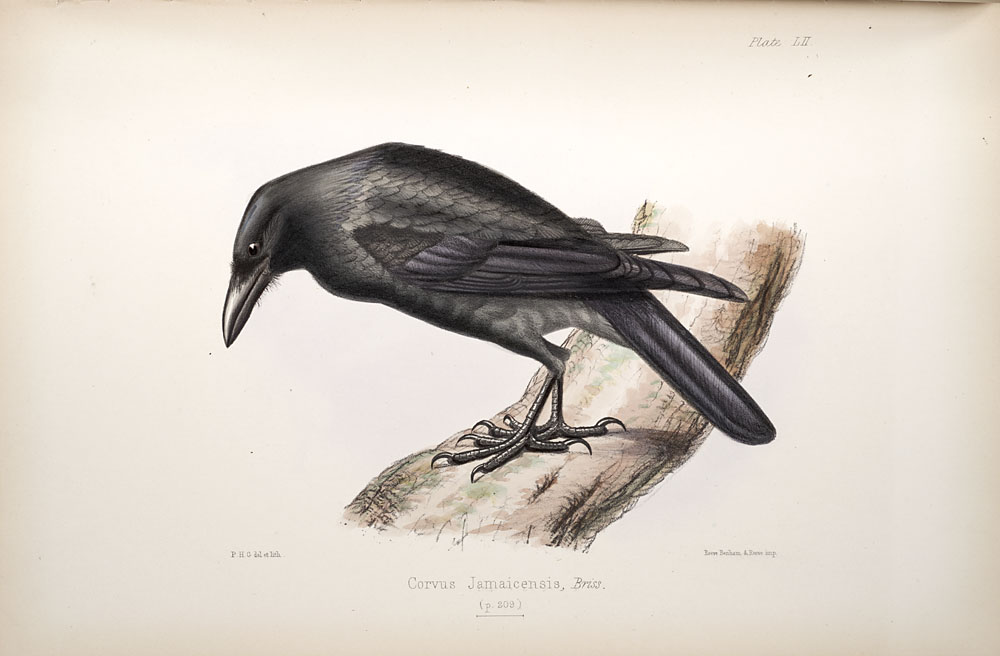
- Illustration by Philip Henry Gosse from 1849

Conservation status
- Near Threatened (IUCN 3.1)

Scientific classification
- Kingdom: Animalia
- Phylum: Chordata
- Class: Aves
- Order: Passeriformes
- Family: Corvidae
- Genus: Corvus
- Species: C. jamaicensis

Binomial name
- Corvus jamaicensis Gmelin, JF, 1788
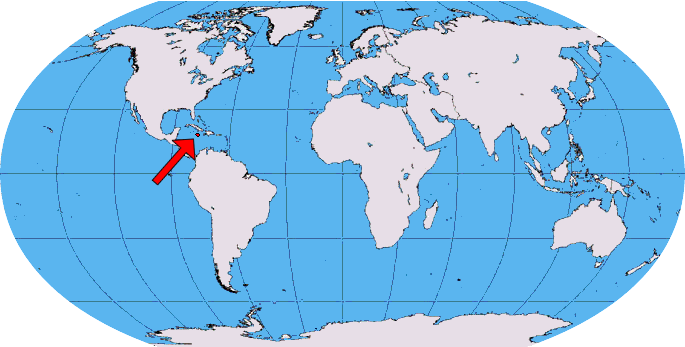
- Distribution map

= Jamaican crow =

Species of bird

The Jamaican crow (Corvus jamaicensis) is a comparatively small corvid (35–38 cm in length). It shares several key morphological features with two other West Indian species, the Cuban crow (Corvus nasicus) and the white-necked crow (Corvus leucognaphalus) of Hispaniola, which are very closely related to it.

== Taxonomy ==
The Jamaican crow, under the name "chattering crow", was described by the English naturalists John Ray in 1713 and Hans Sloane in 1725. The Irish physician Patrick Browne used the name "gabbling crow" for the species in 1756. In France the naturalists Mathurin Jacques Brisson in 1760 and Comte de Buffon both used the name "La corneille de la Jamaique". A binomial name was not introduced until 1788 when the German naturalist Johann Friedrich Gmelin revised and expanded Carl Linnaeus's Systema Naturae and coined the binomial name Corvus jamaicensis. The species is monotypic: no subspecies are recognised.

== Description ==
The overall appearance is sooty-grey, not at all glossy, like its relatives; though it does possess a similar dark grey patch of naked skin just behind the eye, and a smaller naked patch at the base of the bill. The bill itself is slate-grey and quite deep, tapering to a sharp point. The nasal bristles are relatively sparse usually leaving the nostrils on view. The iris is either grey-brown or red-brown, possibly depending on age. The legs and feet are black.

The voice, like its two nearest relatives, is very distinctive and consists of various jabbering and bubbling sounds (thus its common Jamaican Patois name, jabbering crow), but also a more leisurely "craaa-aa" and variations thereof, and somewhat of a musical burbling.

== Distribution and habitat ==
As its name suggests, this species is found on the island of Jamaica, where it inhabits woodland mixed with cleared areas, and can be frequently found in larger gardens. Though primarily a bird of hill and mountain forest, it comes down to lower elevations during the dry season, where it is more likely to be seen.

== Behaviour and ecology ==
=== Food and feeding ===
A forest crow by nature, its food requirements contain a significant proportion of fruit taken from trees, either in pairs or small groups. It also probes under bark and leaf litter for small invertebrates and lizards, and it is known to raid other birds nests of both eggs and nestlings.

=== Breeding ===
The nest itself is usually built in tall trees; this species may also use tree holes as a possible nesting option, although not yet recorded for this species and its breeding habits.

== See also ==
- John Crow, a local name for the turkey vulture in Jamaica
