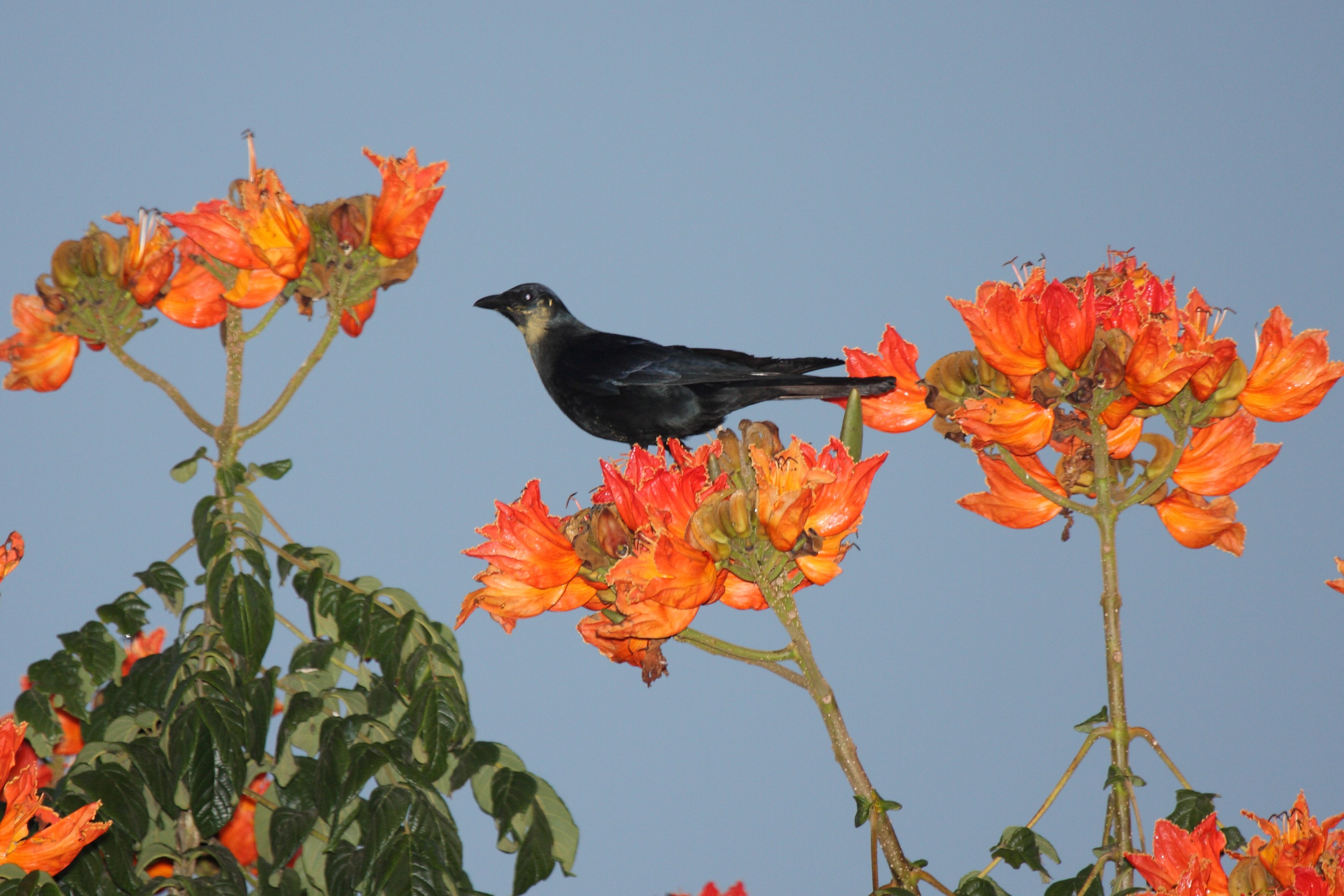

Conservation status
- Least Concern (IUCN 3.1)

Scientific classification
- Kingdom: Animalia
- Phylum: Chordata
- Class: Aves
- Order: Passeriformes
- Family: Corvidae
- Genus: Corvus
- Species: C. sinaloae

Binomial name
- Corvus sinaloae Davis, 1958
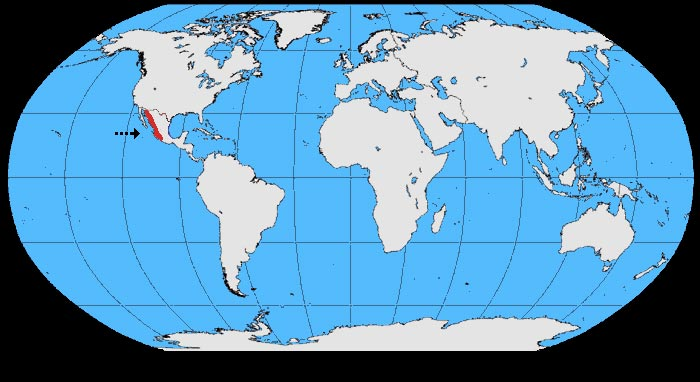
- Range map of Corvus sinaloae

= Sinaloa crow =

Species of bird

The Sinaloa crow (Corvus sinaloae) is a species of bird in the family Corvidae, the crows and jays. It is endemic to Mexico.

== Taxonomy and systematics ==
What is now the Sinaloa crow was long thought to be a population of the "Mexican crow" Corvus imparatus; it was not recognized even as a subspecies. Eventually C. imparatus was named the Tamaulipas crow after the Mexican state where the type specimen had been collected. In 1958 L. Irby Davis published a study of the vocalizations of North American crows and detailed how the western Mexican population had a significantly different voice than the eastern Tamaulipas population. He described it as the new species C. sinaloae, the Sinaloa crow.

The Sinaloa crow is monotypic.

== Description ==
The Sinaloa crow is 35.5 to 38 cm (14 to 15 in) long; two individuals weighed 229 and 258 g (8.1 and 9.1 oz). The sexes have the same plumage, which is nearly identical to that of the Tamaulipas crow. Adults have glossy dark violet crown, nape, secondary wing coverts, and secondaries. The sides of their neck and their back, scapulars, rump, uppertail coverts, and primary coverts are glossy dark violet blue. Their primaries and rectrices are dark steel blue with a greenish tinge on the outer primaries and a violet tinge on the central rectrices. The sides of their head and their underparts are dark steel blue or greenish steel blue that becomes more greenish to the rear. They have a dark brown iris, a black bill, and black legs and feet. Juveniles are overall duller than adults.

== Distribution and habitat ==
The Sinaloa crow is found in western Mexico from southern Sonora south to southwestern Nayarit and east into western Durango. It inhabits gallery forest, deciduous forest, towns and villages, and pastures and agricultural land in the tropical zone. Though Davis described the species as also being found "on wet sand of the sea beach when the tide is out and along river estuaries", a previous publication addressing the pre-split C. imparatus had said that it avoided "maritime associations". Sources differ on its elevation range; two place it from sea level to 1,000 m (3,300 ft) and one only as high as 700 m (2,300 ft).

== Behavior ==
=== Movement ===
The Sinaloa crow is a year-round resident.

=== Feeding ===
The Sinaloa crow is omnivorous; though detailed studies are lacking it has been observed feeding on "seeds, insects, fruit, roadkills, and garbage". It forages at all levels of its habitat. It is found in pairs, in small flocks, and outside of the breeding season in flocks that may reach 125 individuals.

=== Breeding ===
The Sinaloa crow's breeding season has not been fully defined but in Sonora spans from late May to mid-July. Its bulky nest is made from sticks. The clutch is four to five eggs that are pale blue to blue-gray with brown markings. Nothing else is known about the species' breeding biology.

=== Vocalization ===
The Sinaloa crow's voice is the characteristic that led to its recognition as a species separate from the Tamaulipas crow. The Tamaulipas crow's voice is burry or croaking, characters absent from that of the Sinaloa crow. "The call of the adult Sinaloa Crow is so startlingly different from that of the Tamaulipas Crow that a considerable difference in the morphology of the voice-making mechanism is at once suggested. The usual call is a clear ceow". That call is also described as "a cawing caahr or rraah, often doubled", and the species also makes "a disyllabic cah-ow, a short caah!, and a nasal cawing aah or raah".

== Status ==
The IUCN has assessed the Sinaloa crow as being of Least Concern. It has a large range; its estimated population of at least 50,000 mature individuals is believed to be stable. No immediate threats have been identified. It is considered fairly common to common. The species "may benefit from human activities, such as creating new open habitats, suitable for the crow, through conversion of landscapes to agriculture (see Historical Changes), and by providing new sources of food in garbage dumps."
