= Raven =

Larger birds in the genus Corvus

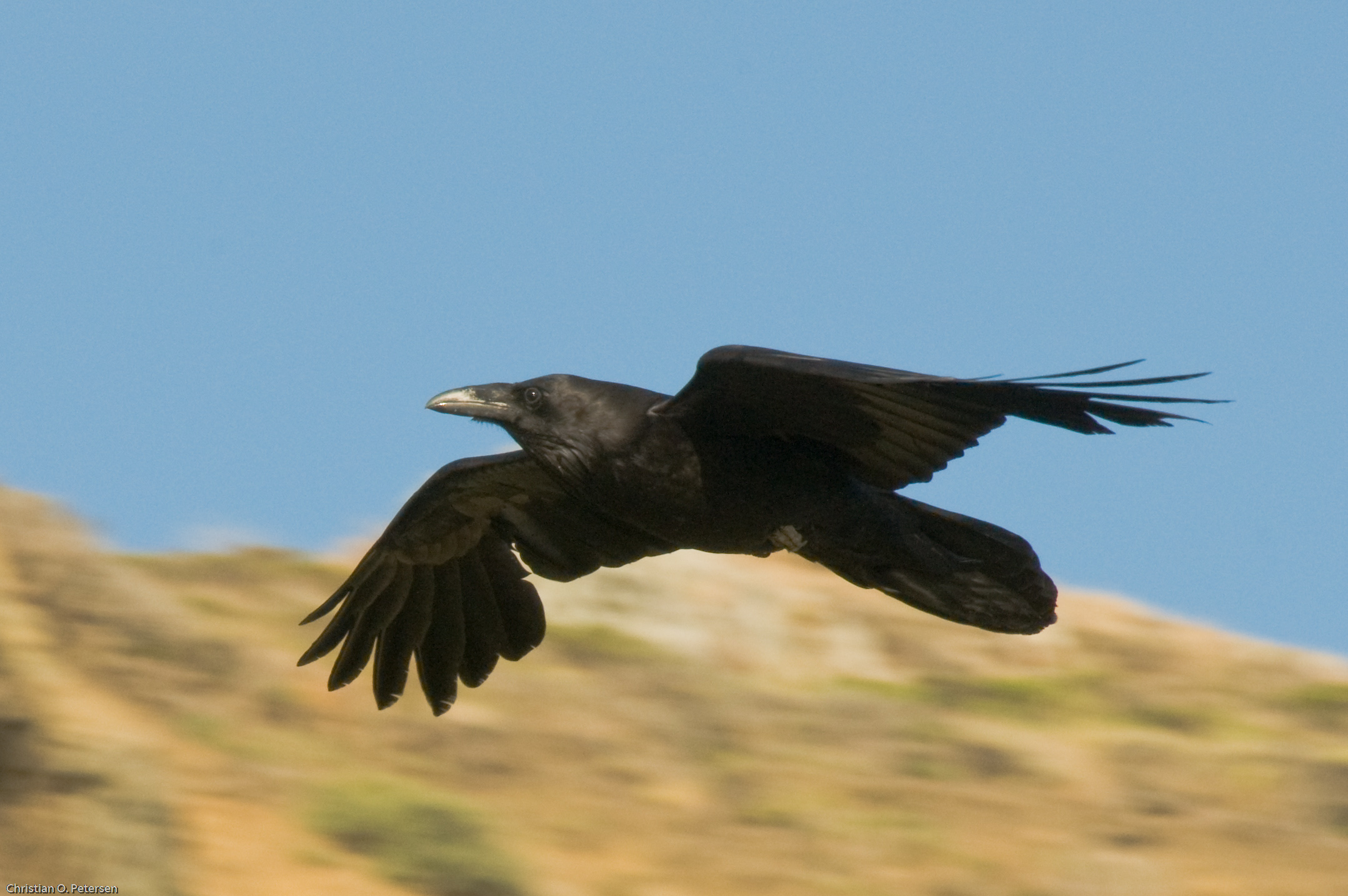
Common raven of California (Corvus corax clarionensis) in flight

A raven is any of several large-bodied passerine bird species in the genus Corvus. These species do not form a single taxonomic group within the genus. There is no consistent distinction between crows and ravens; the two names are assigned to different species mainly by size.

The largest species are the common raven and the thick-billed raven; these are also the largest passerine species.

== Behavior and intelligence ==
Ravens are highly intelligent birds known for problem solving and social behavior. Some species can mimic sounds, including human speech. Ravens and other corvids have also been shown to recognize and remember individual human faces and respond differently based on past interactions.

== Etymology ==
The term raven originally referred to the common raven (Corvus corax), the widespread species of the Northern Hemisphere.

The modern English word raven has cognates in all other Germanic languages, including Old Norse (and subsequently modern Icelandic) hrafn and Old High German (h)Raban, both of which descend from Proto-Germanic *hrabanaz.

Collective nouns for a group of ravens include a "conspiracy", a "treachery", a "rave" and an "unkindness". In practice, most people use the more generic "flock".

== Extant species ==
- Corvus albicollis – White-necked raven (East and Southern Africa)
- Corvus corax – Common raven (Northern Hemisphere)
- Corvus coronoides – Australian raven (Australia)
- Corvus crassirostris – Thick-billed raven (Horn of Africa)
- Corvus cryptoleucus – Chihuahuan raven (United States and Mexico)
- Corvus edithae – Dwarf raven (Horn of Africa)
- Corvus mellori – Little raven (southeastern Australia)
- Corvus rhipidurus – Fan-tailed raven (East Africa and Arabian Peninsula)
- Corvus ruficollis – Brown-necked raven (North Africa, Arabian Peninsula, greater Middle East)
- Corvus tasmanicus – Forest raven (Tasmania, southern Victoria and northeastern New South Wales in Australia)

== Extinct species and color morphs ==
- †Corvus moriorum – New Zealand raven
- †Corvus corax varius morpha leucophaeus – Pied raven (an extinct color morph of the North Atlantic subspecies of the common raven)

== Gallery ==
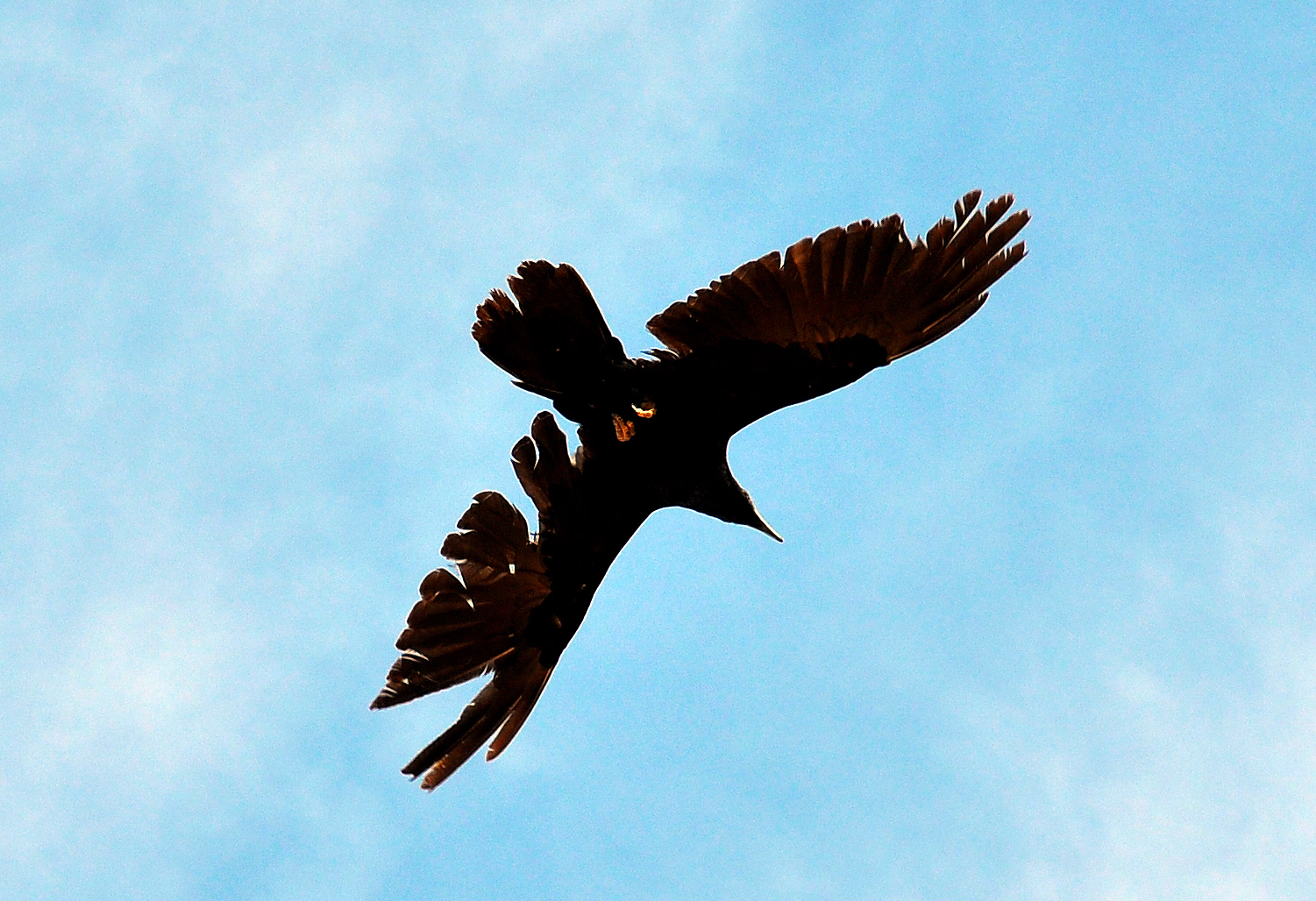
A raven with a damaged wing can still fly with apparent ease
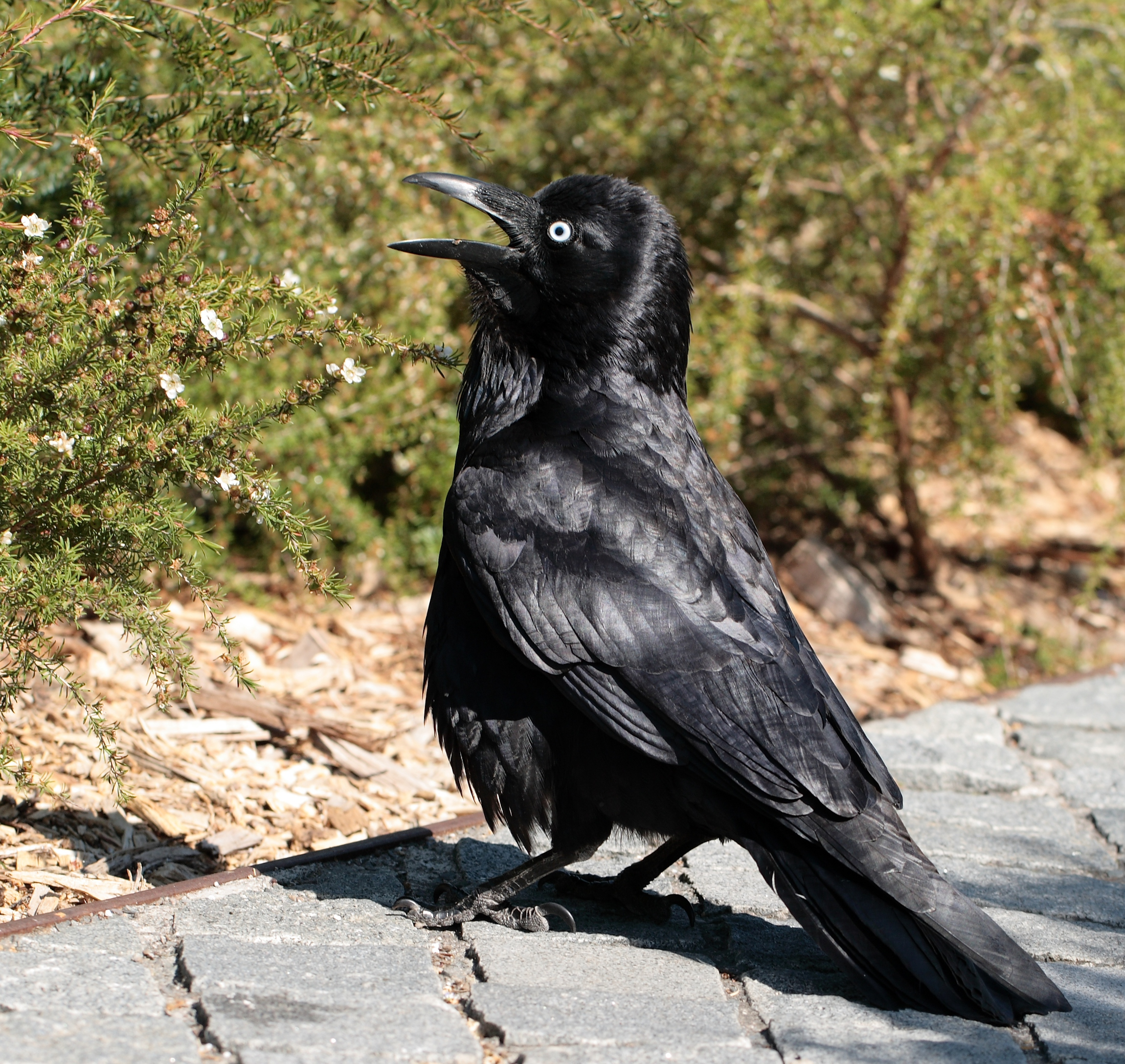
Australian raven

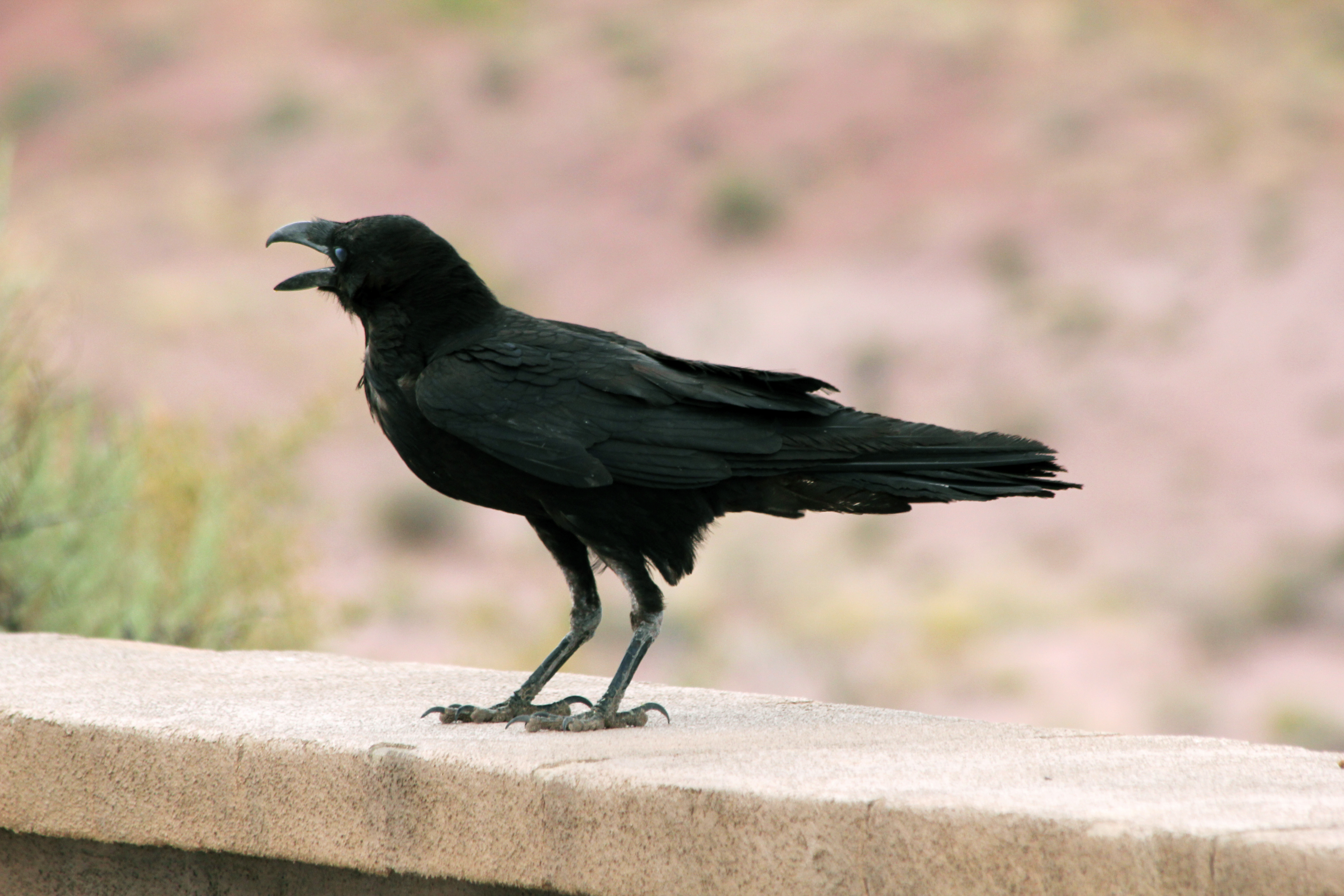
Chihuahuan

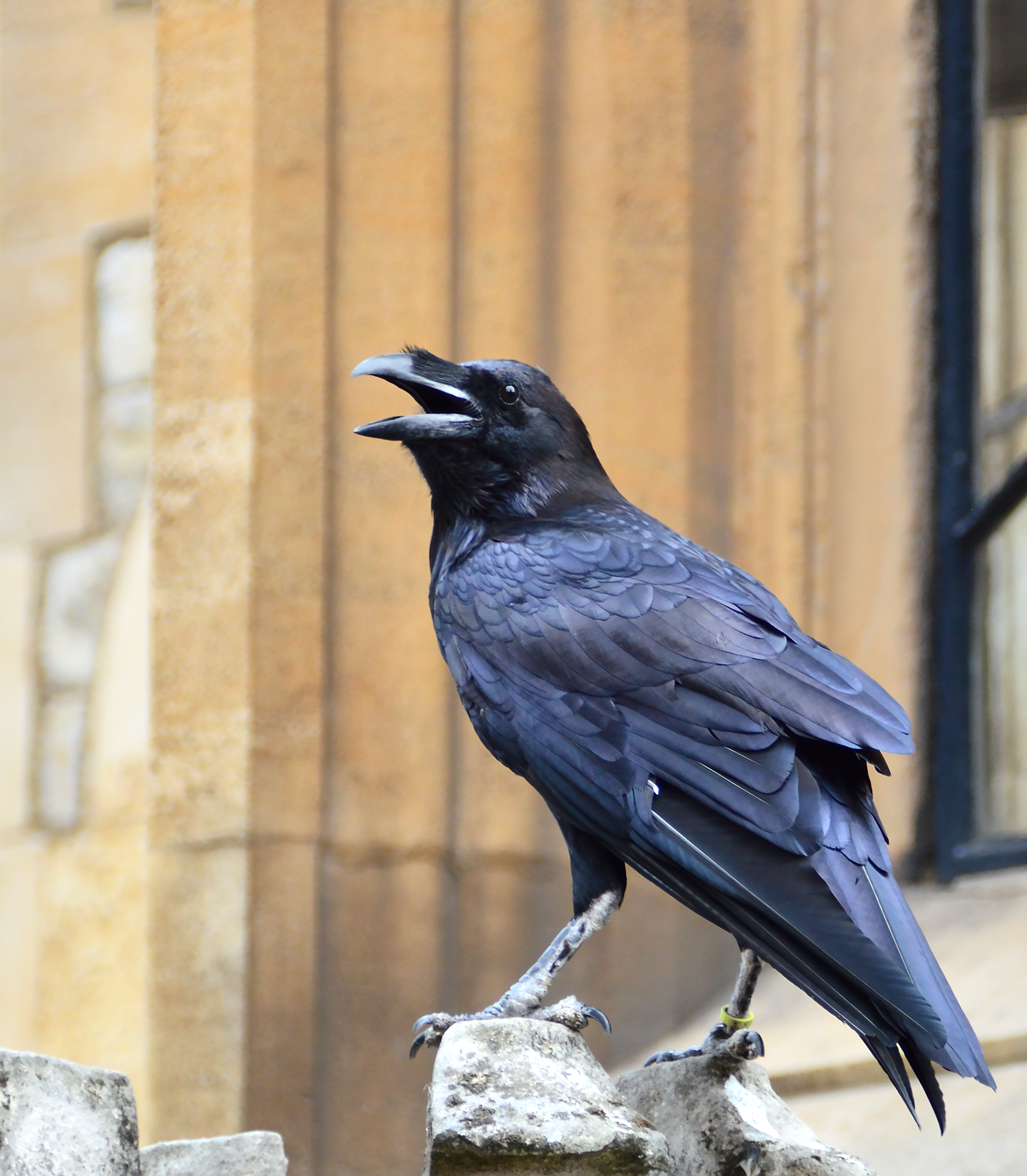
Common

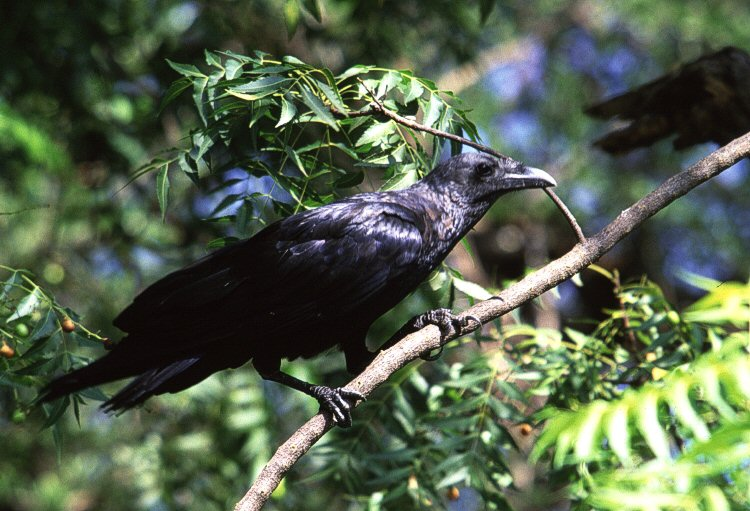
Fan-tailed

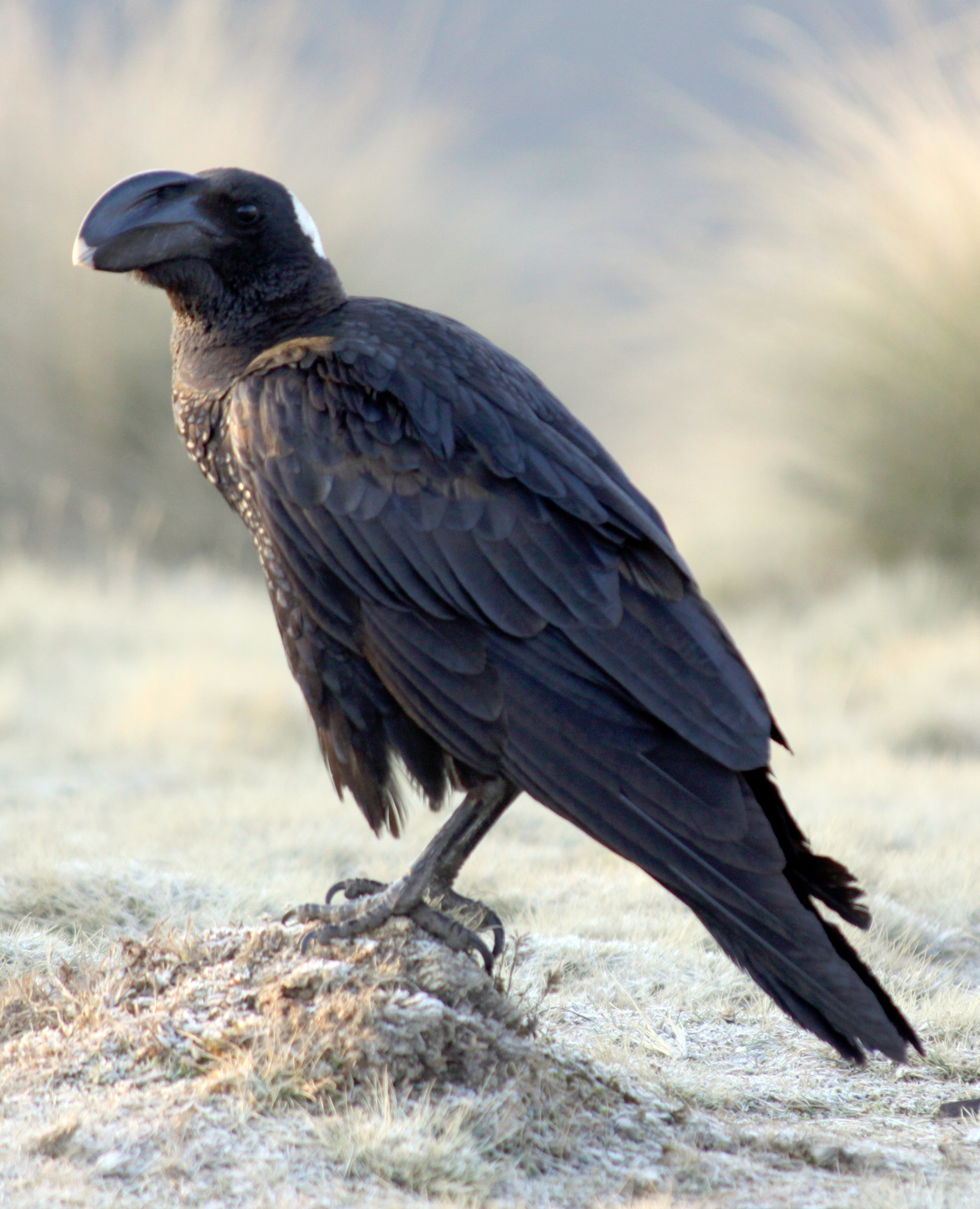
Thick-billed

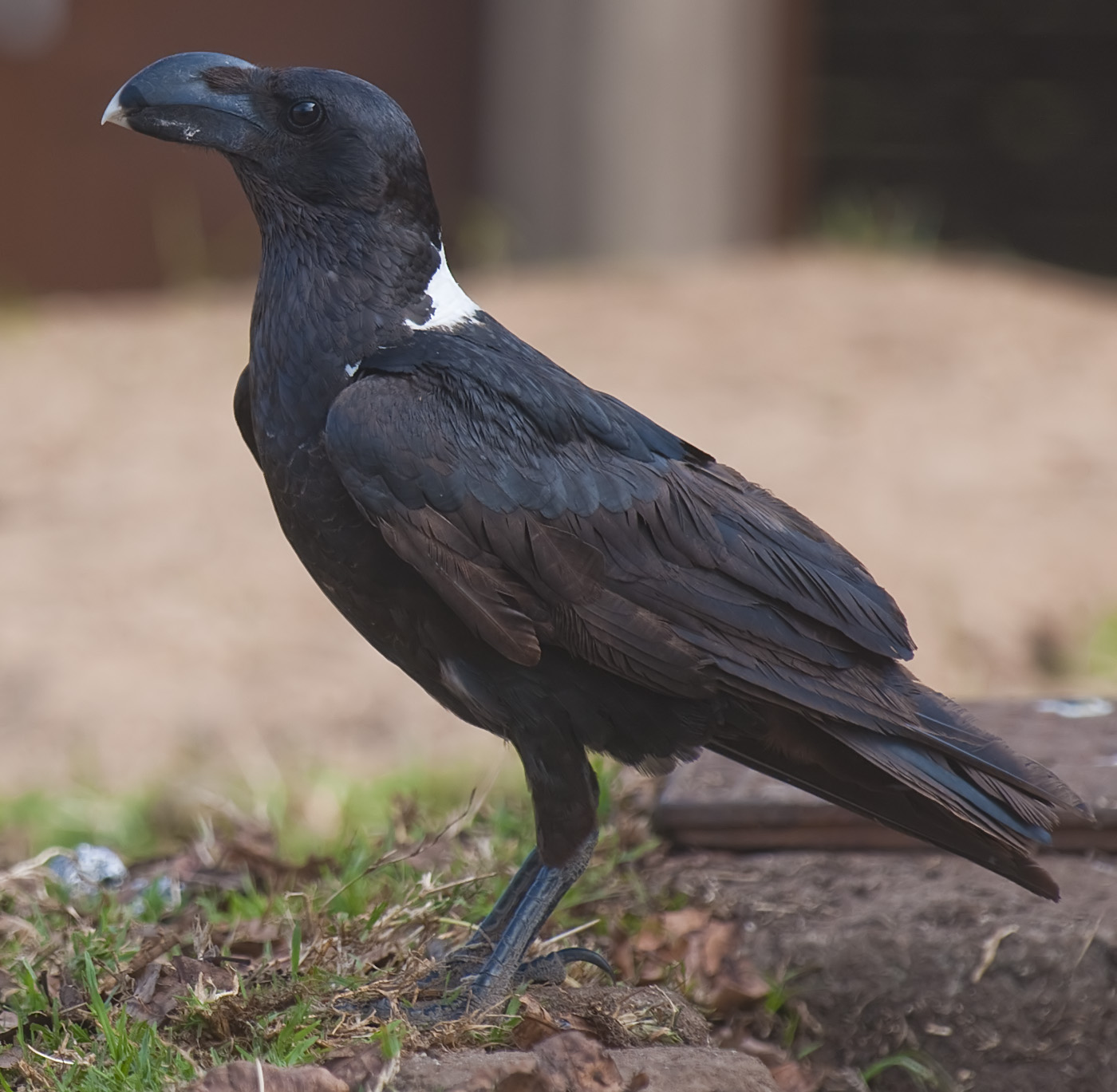
White-necked

== See also ==
- Cultural depictions of ravens
- Ravens of the Tower of London
