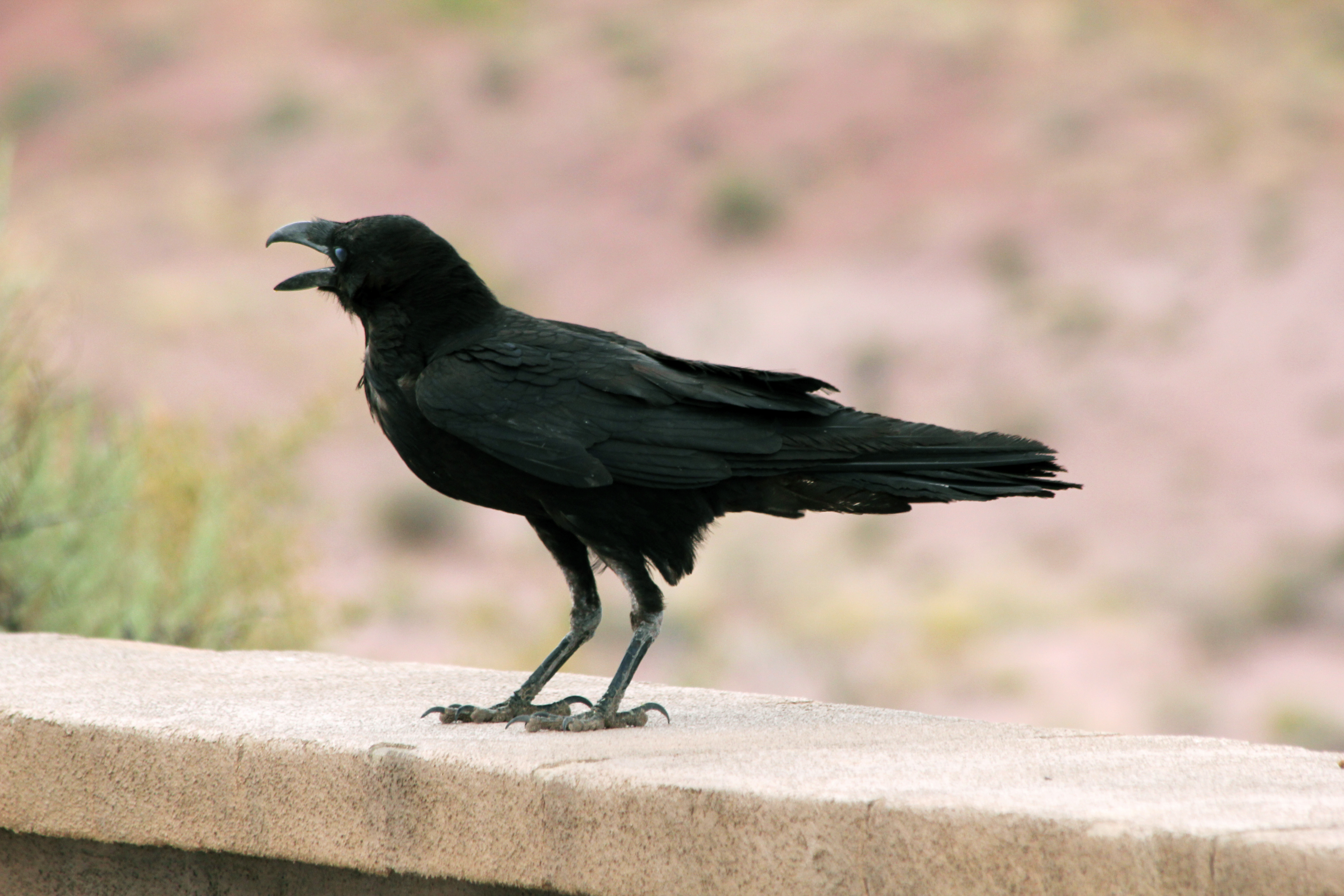
- Chihuahuan raven calling in Arizona

Conservation status
- Least Concern (IUCN 3.1)

- Secure (NatureServe)

Scientific classification
- Kingdom: Animalia
- Phylum: Chordata
- Class: Aves
- Order: Passeriformes
- Family: Corvidae
- Genus: Corvus
- Species: C. cryptoleucus

Binomial name
- Corvus cryptoleucus Couch, 1854
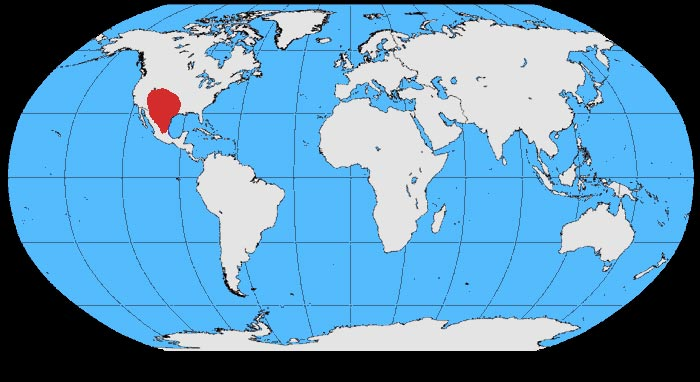
- Distribution map

= Chihuahuan raven =

Species of bird

The Chihuahuan raven (Corvus cryptoleucus) is a species in the family Corvidae that is native to the United States and Mexico.

== Description ==
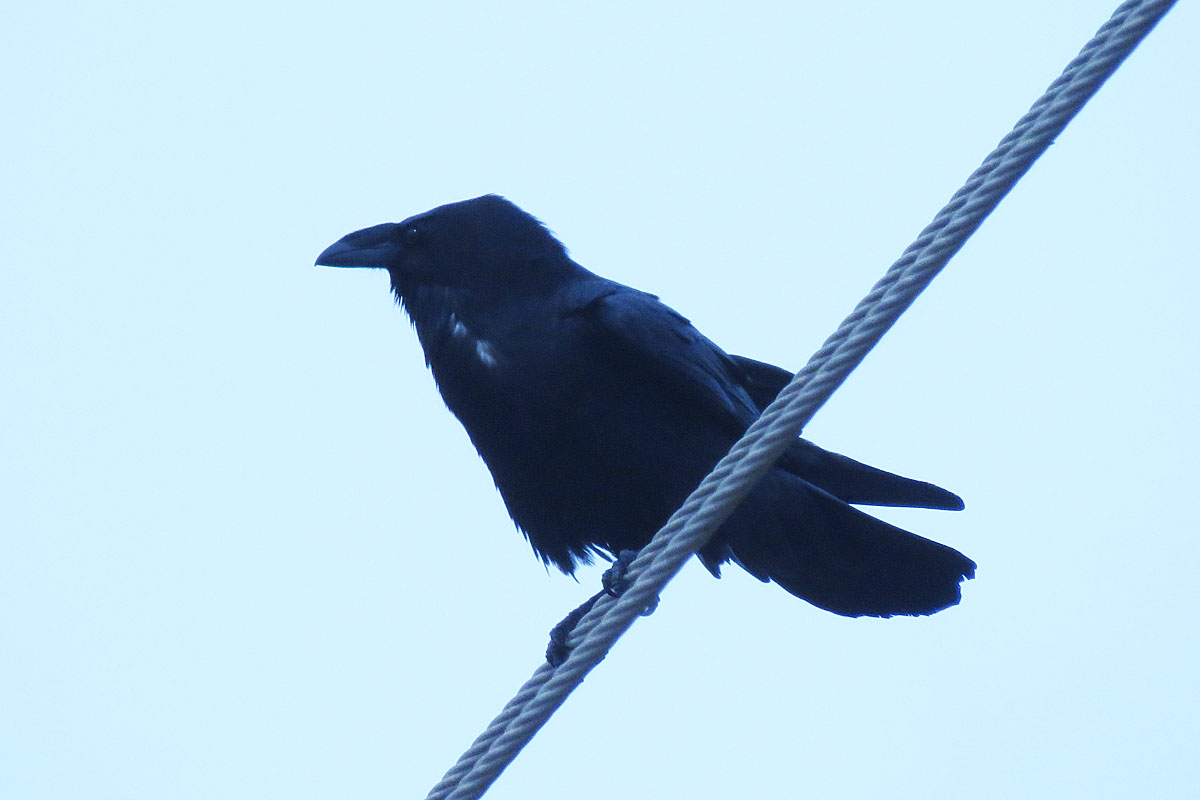
Chihuahuan raven with whitish neck visible

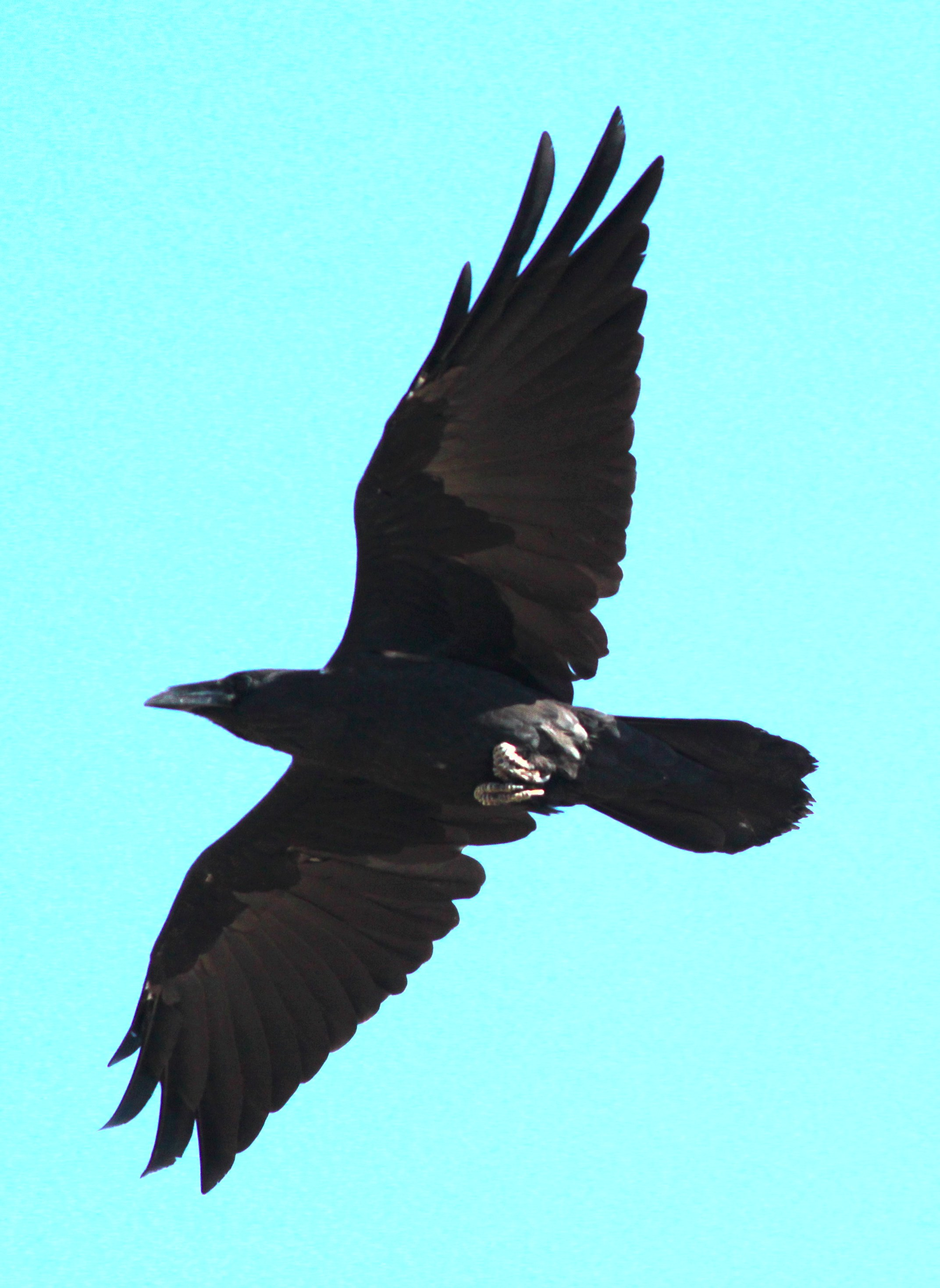
In flight, seen from below

The proportions resemble the common raven with a heavy bill, but is about the same size as a carrion crow, or slightly larger than the American crow (44–51 cm (17–20 in) long). The plumage is all-black with a rich purple-blue gloss in good light. Like the forest raven, little raven, fan-tailed raven and Australian raven, it is one of the smaller raven species. The larger species of raven are the common raven, thick-billed raven, white-necked raven and brown-necked raven, with the common and thick-billed ravens being the world's largest raven species and the little and fan-tailed ravens being the smallest. The Chihuahuan raven is similar in appearance to the Australian raven, although with dark brown irises and whiter feather bases. The nasal bristles extend further down the top of the bill than in any other Corvus species to about two-thirds the length. In addition, the Chihuahuan raven is similar in appearance to the white-necked raven of east Africa because the base of the neck has feathers that are white-ish (seen only when ruffled in strong wind). The bill, legs and feet are black.

== Distribution and habitat ==
The Chihuahuan raven occurs in the Southwestern and Midwestern United States and northern Mexico, including southeastern Arizona, southern New Mexico, southeastern Colorado, western Kansas, western Oklahoma, and southern and western Texas.

== Behavior ==
=== Diet ===
It feeds on cultivated cereal grains, insects and many other invertebrates, small reptiles, carrion, cactus fruits, eggs and nestlings.

=== Nesting ===
The nest is built in either trees, large shrubs or sometimes even in old buildings. There are usually 5–7 eggs laid relatively late in the year during May so as to take advantage of the insect food for their young in their more arid environment. Both the males and females incubate the eggs, feed the young, and remain territorial in protecting the nesting area. In rare cases, outsiders may be allowed into the territory to communally defend against potential predators.

=== Voice ===
The voice is similar to that of the common raven with "pruk-pruk" sounds and other croaks at slightly higher pitches. Like all corvids, the Chihuahuan raven is capable of vocal mimicry. However, this behavior is mostly recorded in captivity and rarely in the wild.

== Taxonomy ==
A 2005 molecular study reviewed segments of DNA of the common raven and found that Chihuahuan raven are genetically nested within common ravens based on mitochondrial DNA. That is, common ravens from the California clade are more similar in mtDNA to Chihuahuan ravens than they are to common ravens in the Holarctic clade.
