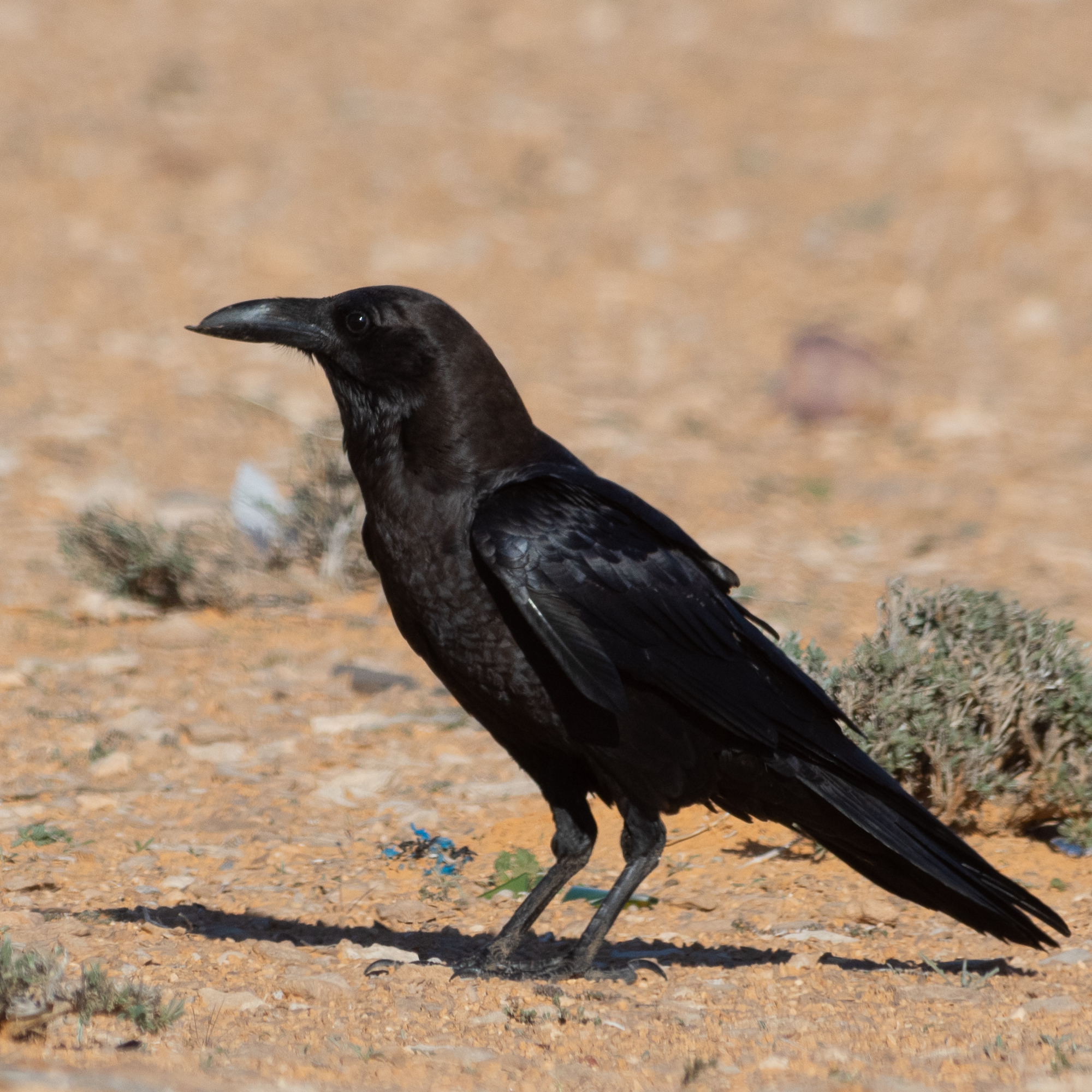
- Near Jebil National Park, Tunisia

Conservation status
- Least Concern (IUCN 3.1)

Scientific classification
- Kingdom: Animalia
- Phylum: Chordata
- Class: Aves
- Order: Passeriformes
- Family: Corvidae
- Genus: Corvus
- Species: C. ruficollis

Binomial name
- Corvus ruficollis Lesson, 1831
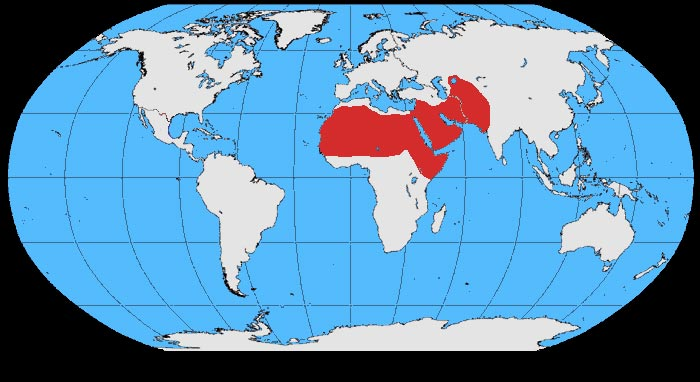
- Distribution map

Synonyms
- Corvus umbrinus Sundevall

= Brown-necked raven =

Species of bird

The brown-necked raven (Corvus ruficollis) is a larger bird (52–56 cm in length) than the carrion crow though not as large as the common raven. It has similar proportions to the common raven but the bill is not so large or deep and the wings tend to be a little more pointed in profile. The head and throat are a distinct brownish-black giving the bird its English name, while the rest of the plumage is black glossed with purple, blue or purplish-blue. Like the common raven, thick-billed raven and white-necked raven, it is one of the larger raven species. The feathers of this species often fade quite quickly to a brownish black (even the truly black feathers) and the bird can look distinctly brown by the time it moults. The feet, legs and bill are black. The dwarf raven was formerly considered a subspecies (Corvus ruficollis edithae) but this bird now appears to be closer to the pied crow (C. albus) than this species.

== Distribution and habitat ==
This species has a wide range across virtually the whole of North Africa, down as far as Kenya, the Arabian Peninsula and up into the Greater Middle East and southern Iran. It lives in a predominantly desert environment visiting oases and palm groves.

Food consists of a wide range of items, including carrion, snakes, locusts and other grasshoppers, stranded fish (in coastal areas), grain stolen from bags, dates and other fruits. It is quite fearless when not persecuted but is quick to become wary and shy if too much attention is paid to it. A 2009 Israeli study showed the species to cooperatively hunt lizards, with birds blocking exits while others hunted.

== Nesting ==
The nest is very much like the common raven's, and may be found in trees, on cliffs or in old and ruined buildings. The dwarf raven seems to prefer thorn trees for its nest building. There are usually 4–5 eggs laid and incubated over 20–22 days. The young usually leave the nest by the 37th or 38th day and can fly well by 42–45 days.

== Vocalisation ==
The voice is very similar to the common raven's consisting mainly of croaks, though higher in pitch; and a harsh "karr-karr-karr". In flight, it will utter a "kuerk-kuerk" call. Like all corvids, the Brown-necked raven is capable of vocal mimicry, however this behavior is mostly recorded in captivity and, although rarely, in the wild.

== Gallery ==
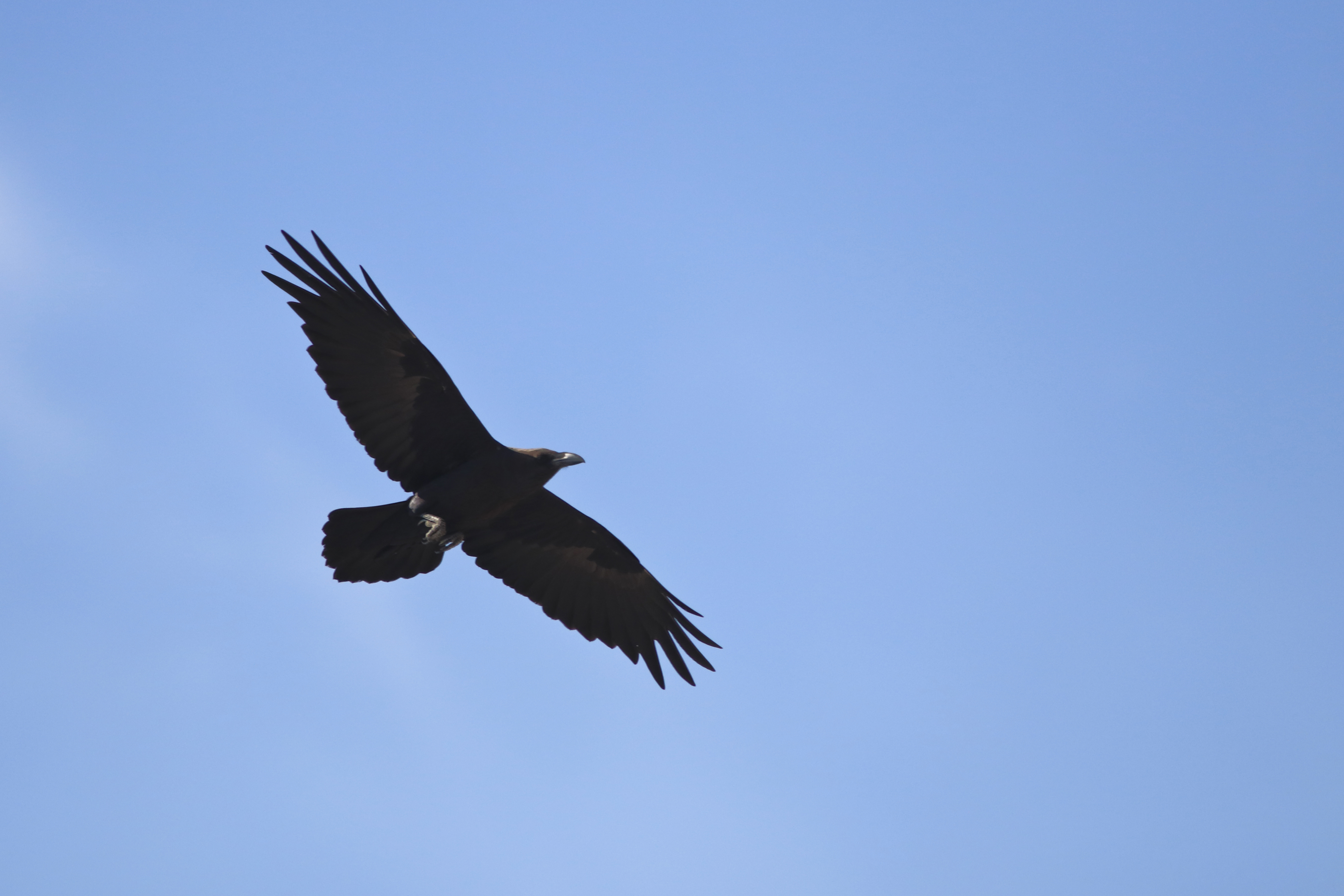
Corvus ruficollis from United Arab Emirates

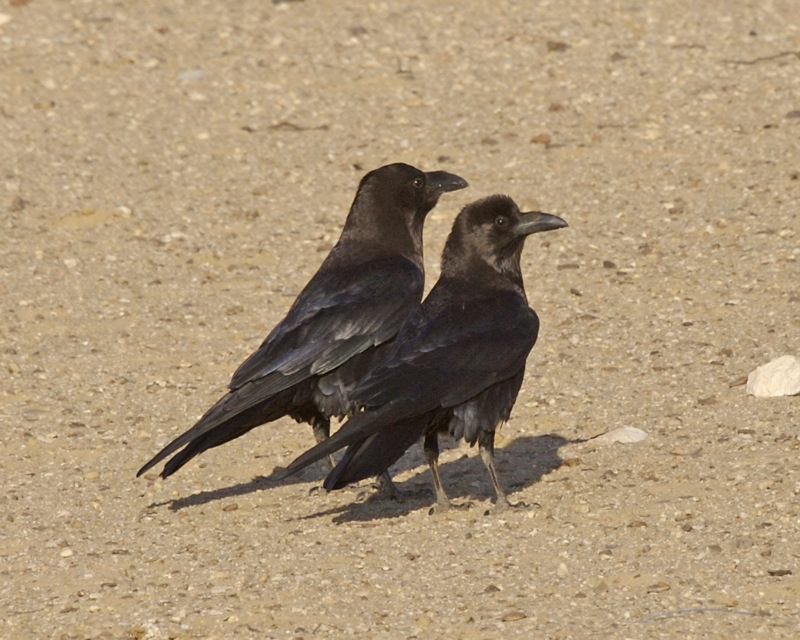
Two brown-necked ravens in Egypt

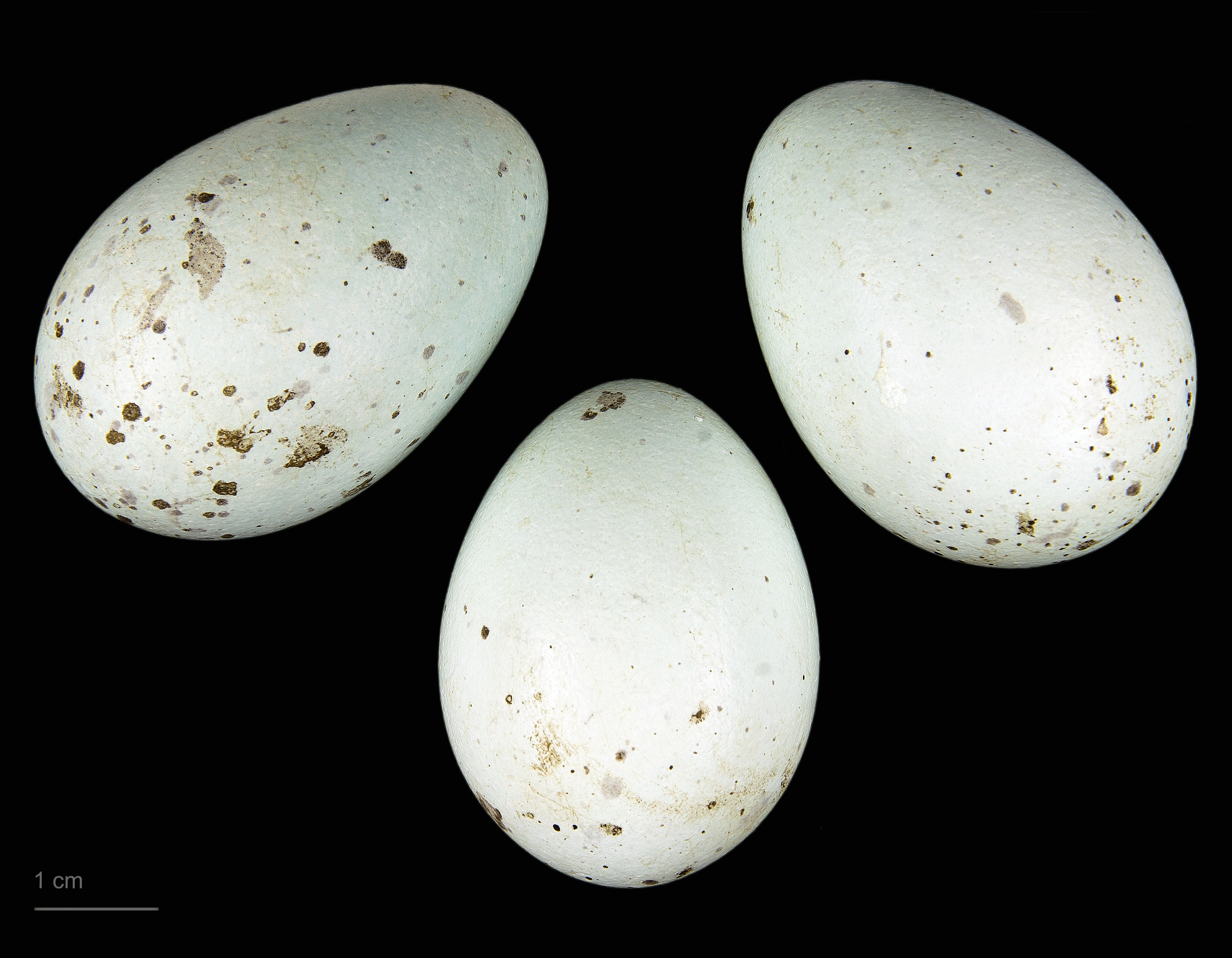
Corvus ruficollis - (MHNT)
