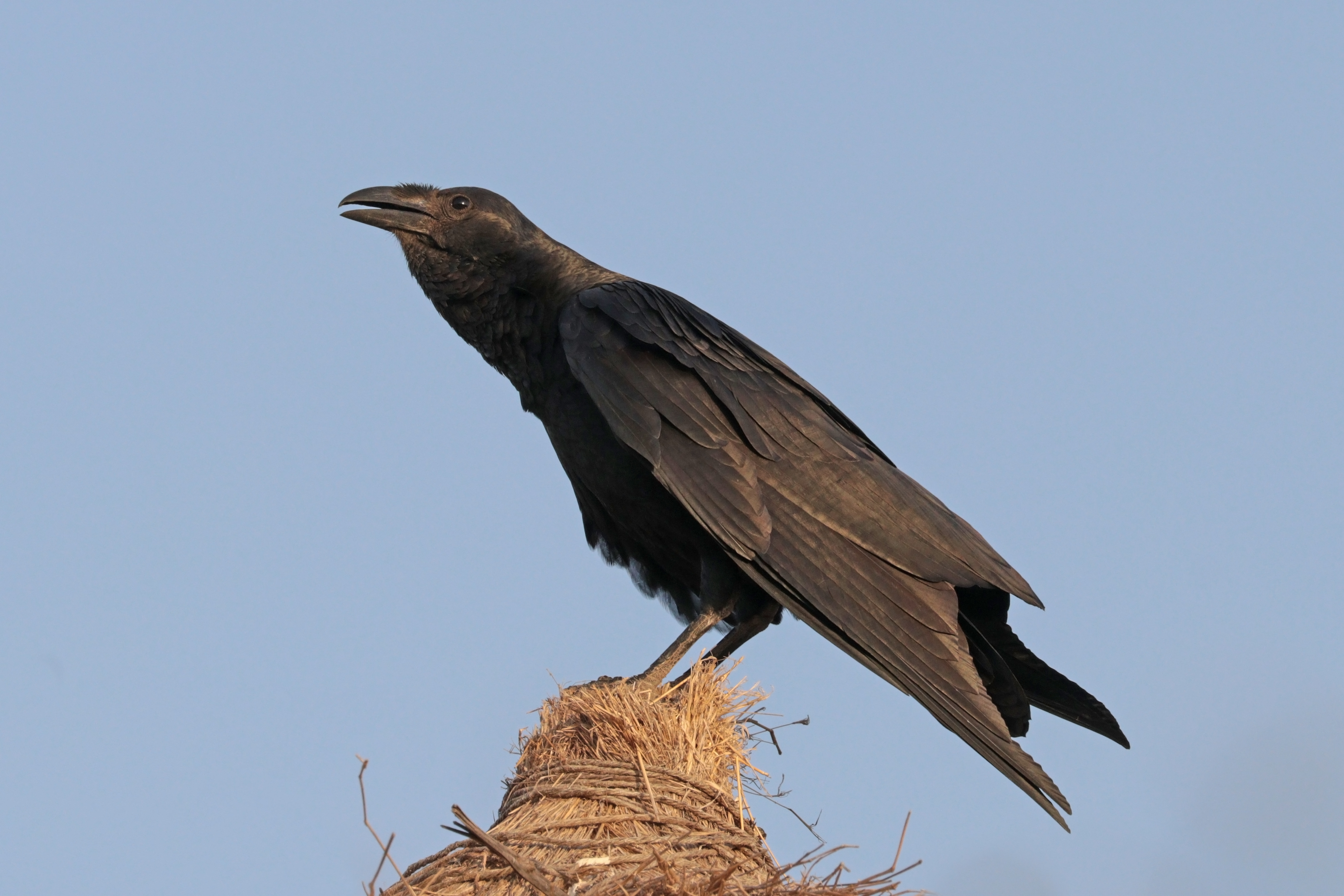
- Awash National Park, Ethiopia

Conservation status
- Least Concern (IUCN 3.1)

Scientific classification
- Kingdom: Animalia
- Phylum: Chordata
- Class: Aves
- Order: Passeriformes
- Family: Corvidae
- Genus: Corvus
- Species: C. rhipidurus

Binomial name
- Corvus rhipidurus Hartert, 1918
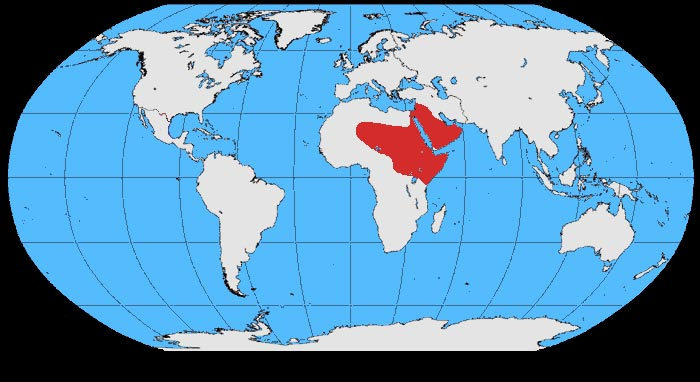
- Distribution map

= Fan-tailed raven =

Species of bird

The fan-tailed raven (Corvus rhipidurus) is a passerine bird of the crow family native to Eastern Africa and the Arabian Peninsula.

== Description ==
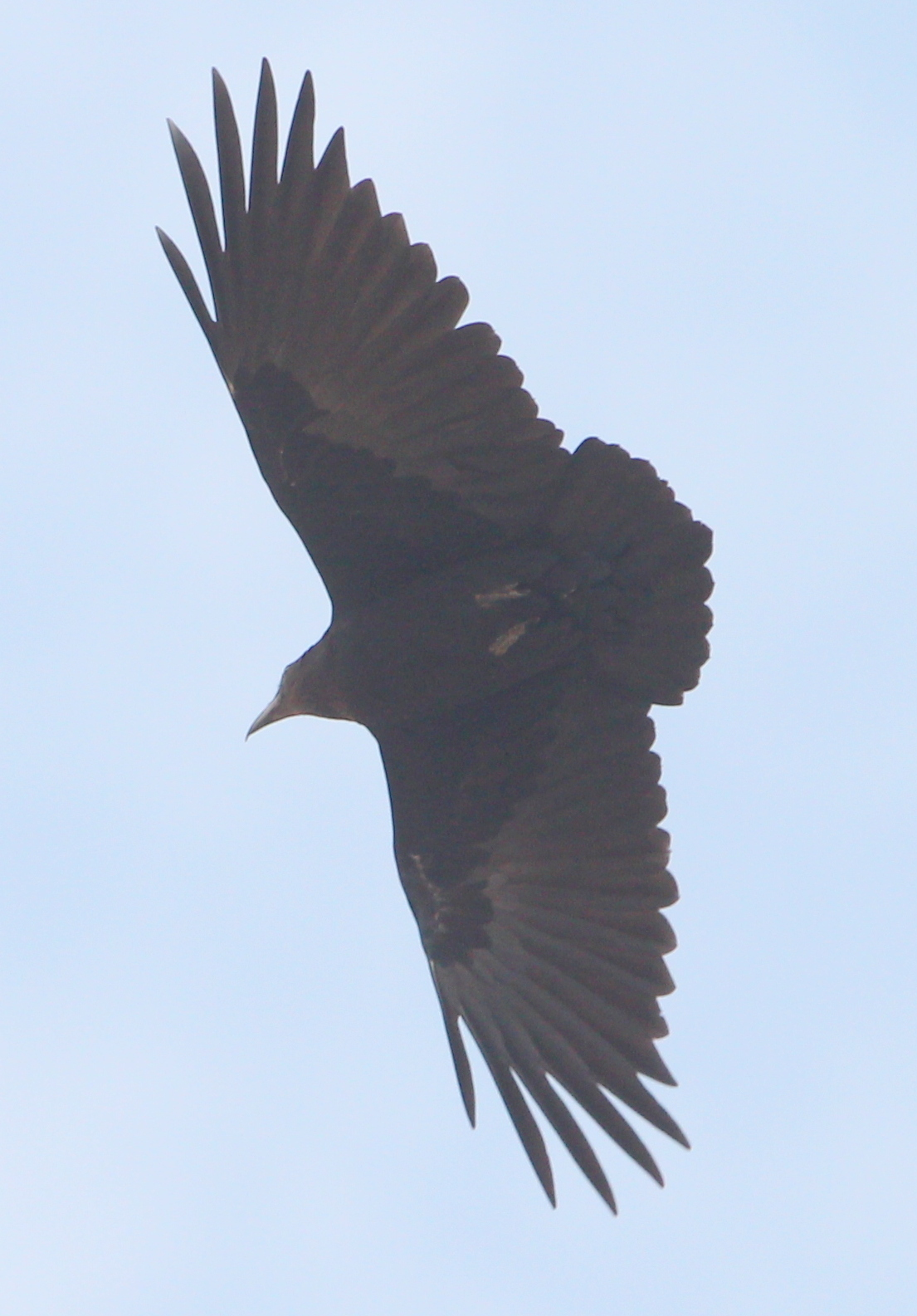
Showing the broad wings and fan-shaped tail

The fan-tailed raven is completely black including bill, legs and feet and the plumage has a purplish-blue gloss in good light. Worn plumage is slightly coppery-brown. The base of the feathers on the upper neck are white and only seen if the bird is inspected or a strong gust blows them the wrong way. The throat hackles are shorter than in most other ravens. One of the smaller raven species, it is about the same size or slightly larger than the carrion crow, at 47–51 cm, but with a much thicker bill, shorter tail and much larger wings.

The voice is described as guttural croaks mixed with the sound of frog-call. Like all corvids, the fan-tailed raven is capable of vocal mimicry; however, this behavior is mostly recorded in captivity and, very rarely, in the wild.

== Distribution and habitat ==
It occurs in the Middle East, North Africa, Arabia, and south to Sudan and Kenya. It also ranges across the Aïr Massif in the southern Sahara. It lives in desert or open dry country that includes crags for nesting. It is one of the most aerial of birds traveling huge distances in search of food, its large wings being adapted to gliding on thermals in a rather vulture-like way.

== Behaviour ==
=== Diet ===
Food is invariably taken on the ground and includes all manner of insects and other invertebrates, grain taken from animal dung, carrion and scraps of human food. It has also been seen taking skin parasites from camels and, where not persecuted, scavenges around rubbish dumps and camp sites. Fruits of all types are eaten readily. It soars and plays in thermals even more so than other raven species and often associates with the brown-necked raven roosting in the same tree as it.

=== Nesting ===
This species nests on rock ledges and in cavities in cliffs though very rarely in Somalia it has been known to nest in trees. There are usually 2–4 eggs laid. The great-spotted cuckoo (Clamator glandarius) sometimes uses this species as a brood host.
