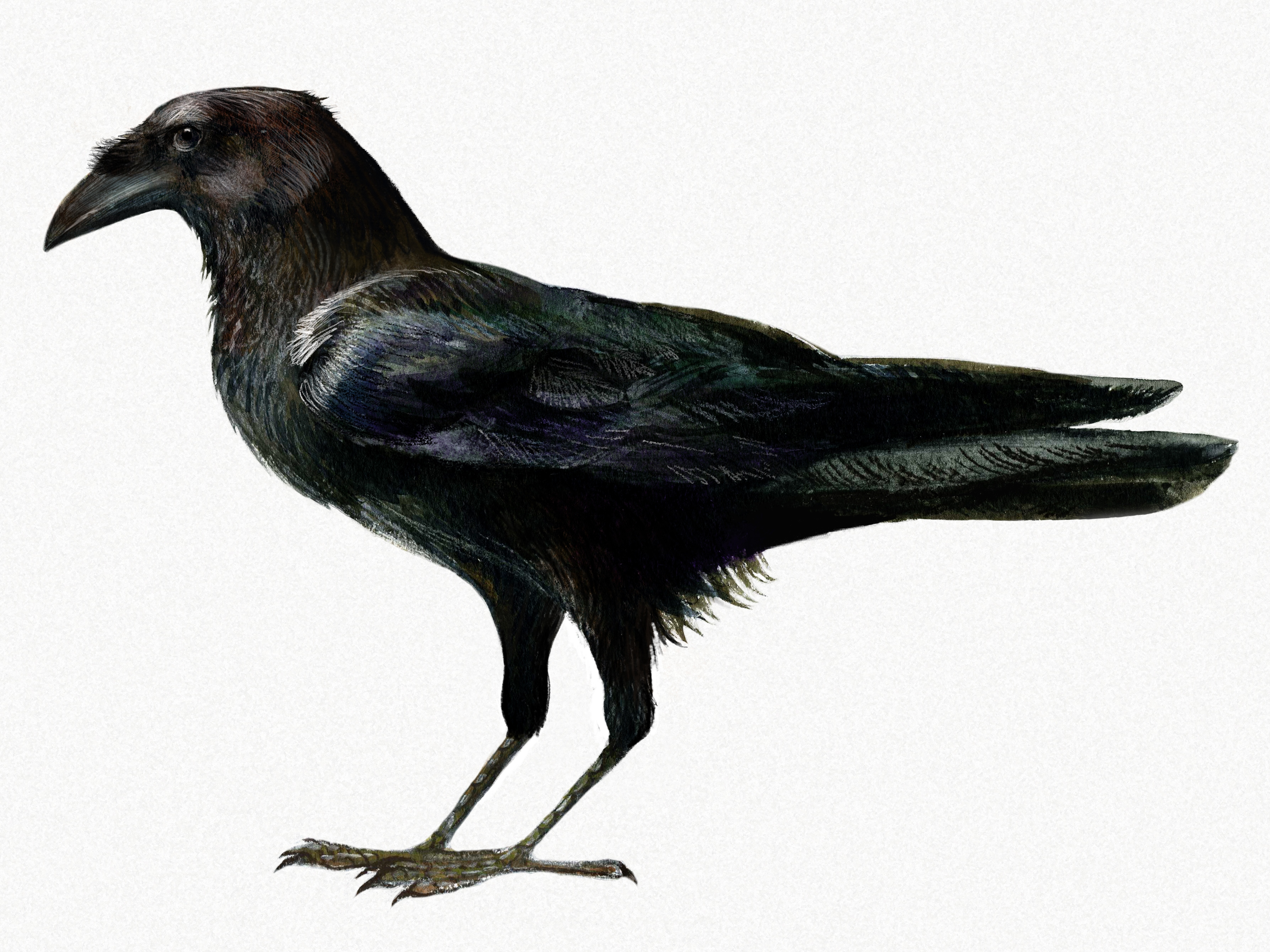
- Adult

Conservation status
- Least Concern (IUCN 3.1)

Scientific classification
- Kingdom: Animalia
- Phylum: Chordata
- Class: Aves
- Order: Passeriformes
- Family: Corvidae
- Genus: Corvus
- Species: C. edithae

Binomial name
- Corvus edithae Lort Phillips, 1895
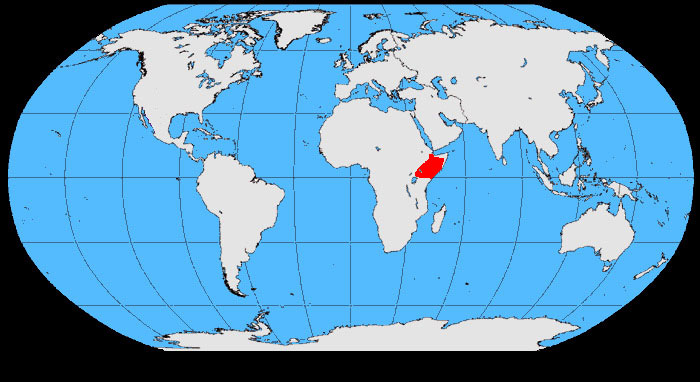
- Distribution map

= Somali crow =

Species of bird

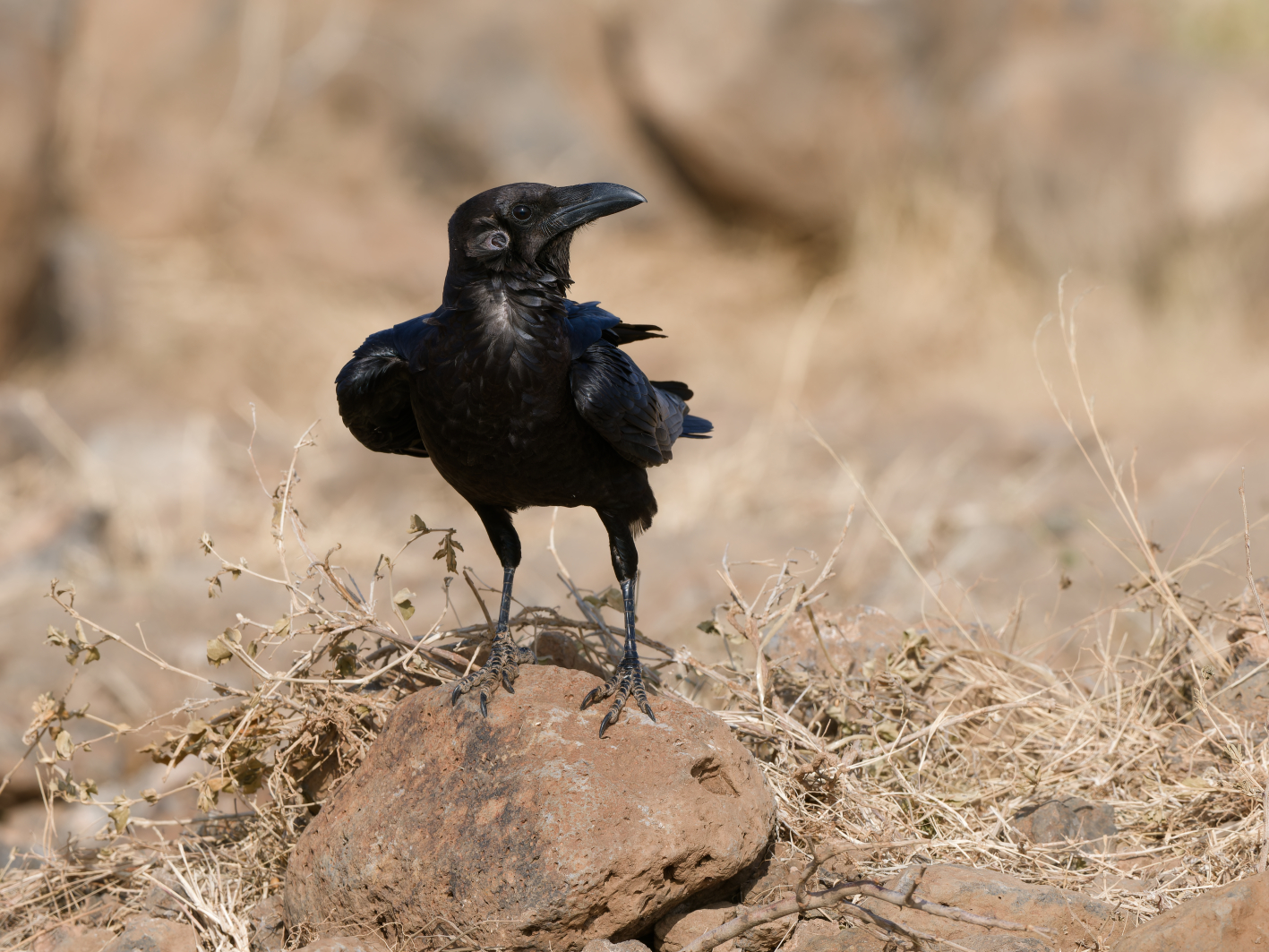
Somali Crow

The Somali crow, or dwarf raven (Corvus edithae), is approximately the size (44–46 cm in length) of the carrion crow, Corvus corone but with a longer bill and a somewhat more brownish cast to the feathers, especially when worn.

== Distribution and species ==
This species occurs principally in Somalia, Djibouti, the Ogaden and the Northern Frontier District in the Horn of Africa, and can be distinguished from the larger brown-necked raven C. ruficollis by its call, appearance and differences in its behaviour.

It was formerly considered a subspecies of the larger brown-necked raven (C. ruficollis), but is now considered to be a distinct species.

This crow is thought to be closer to the pied crow C. albus by some authorities, especially in its behaviour, than to the brown-necked raven. Hybrid birds between the pied crow and the Somali crow appear to reinforce this close relationship where the two species meet.

The nest is a ravenlike bulky structure set in either a lone tree or on telegraph poles. It will nest on cliffs in coastal regions or areas where trees are unavailable. The 3-5 eggs are laid in April and early May.

The voice is described as a harsh "caw" rather like the rook, Corvus frugilegus of Eurasia.
