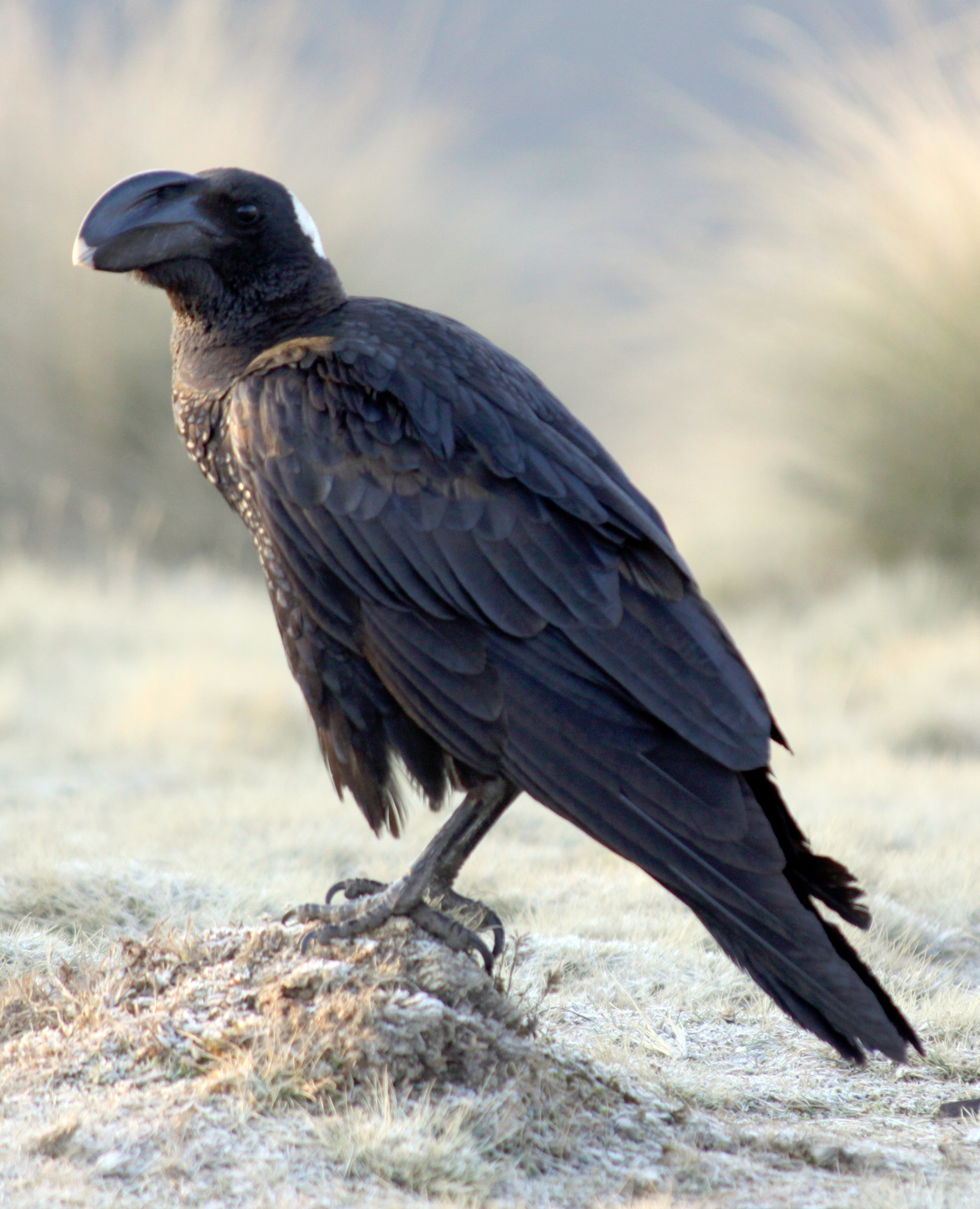
- In Ethiopia

Conservation status
- Least Concern (IUCN 3.1)

Scientific classification
- Kingdom: Animalia
- Phylum: Chordata
- Class: Aves
- Order: Passeriformes
- Family: Corvidae
- Genus: Corvus
- Species: C. crassirostris

Binomial name
- Corvus crassirostris Rüppell, 1836
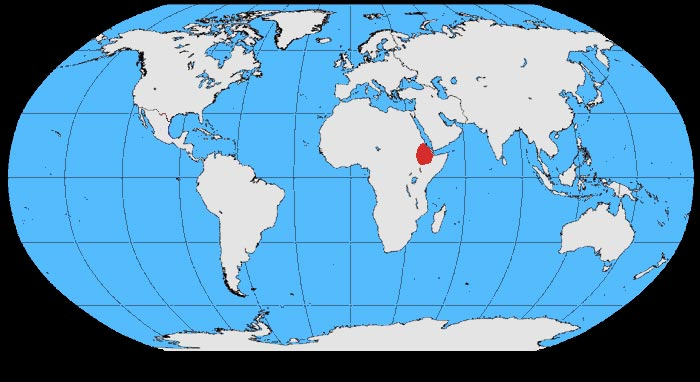

= Thick-billed raven =

Species of bird

The thick-billed raven (Corvus crassirostris) is the largest passerine bird in the family Corvidae. It is endemic to the Horn of Africa, including parts of Ethiopia, Eritrea, Sudan, and Somalia. The thick-billed raven shares with the common raven the distinction of being the world's largest corvid.

== Description ==
The thick-billed raven averages 64 cm (25 in) in length, with a range of 60 to 70 cm (24 to 28 in) and weighs approximately 1.15 kg (2.5 lb) in females and 1.5 kg (3.3 lb) in males on average. Its size is about the same as the largest subspecies of common raven (i.e. those from the Himalayas and Greenland/Canadian Northwest Atlantic) but some common raven subspecies are rather smaller and, going on average weights, the thick-billed raven is likely the heaviest extant passerine. The thick-billed raven is about 25% heavier on average than the Australasian superb lyrebird, which is sometimes erroneously titled the largest passerine.

Its bill is laterally compressed and is deeply curved in profile. This bill, the largest of any passerine at 8–9 cm (3.1–3.5 in) in length, is black with a white tip, with deep nasal grooves and only light nasal bristle covers. This raven has very short feathers on the head, throat and neck. The throat and upper breast have an oily brown gloss, while the rest of the bird is glossy black except for a distinctive white patch of feathers on the nape and onto the neck.

== Distribution and habitat ==
The thick-billed raven breeds in Eritrea and Ethiopia, and has non-breeding populations in Sudan and Somalia. Its habitat includes mountains and high plateau between elevations of 1,500 and 3,400 metres (4,900 and 11,200 ft). It is one of several avian species endemic to northeastern tropical Africa.

== Behaviour ==
=== Diet ===
The thick-billed raven is omnivorous, feeding on grubs, beetle larvae from animal dung, carrion, scraps of meat and human food. It has been seen taking standing wheat. When seeking food from dung, it has been seen using a distinct scything movement to scatter the dung and extract the grubs.

=== Nesting ===
It nests in trees and on cliffs, apparently building a stick nest like the similar and more widely distributed white-necked raven. It lays three to five eggs. In one case, thick-billed ravens were observed to vigorously displace predatory Verreaux's eagle owls from their nest area.

=== Voice ===
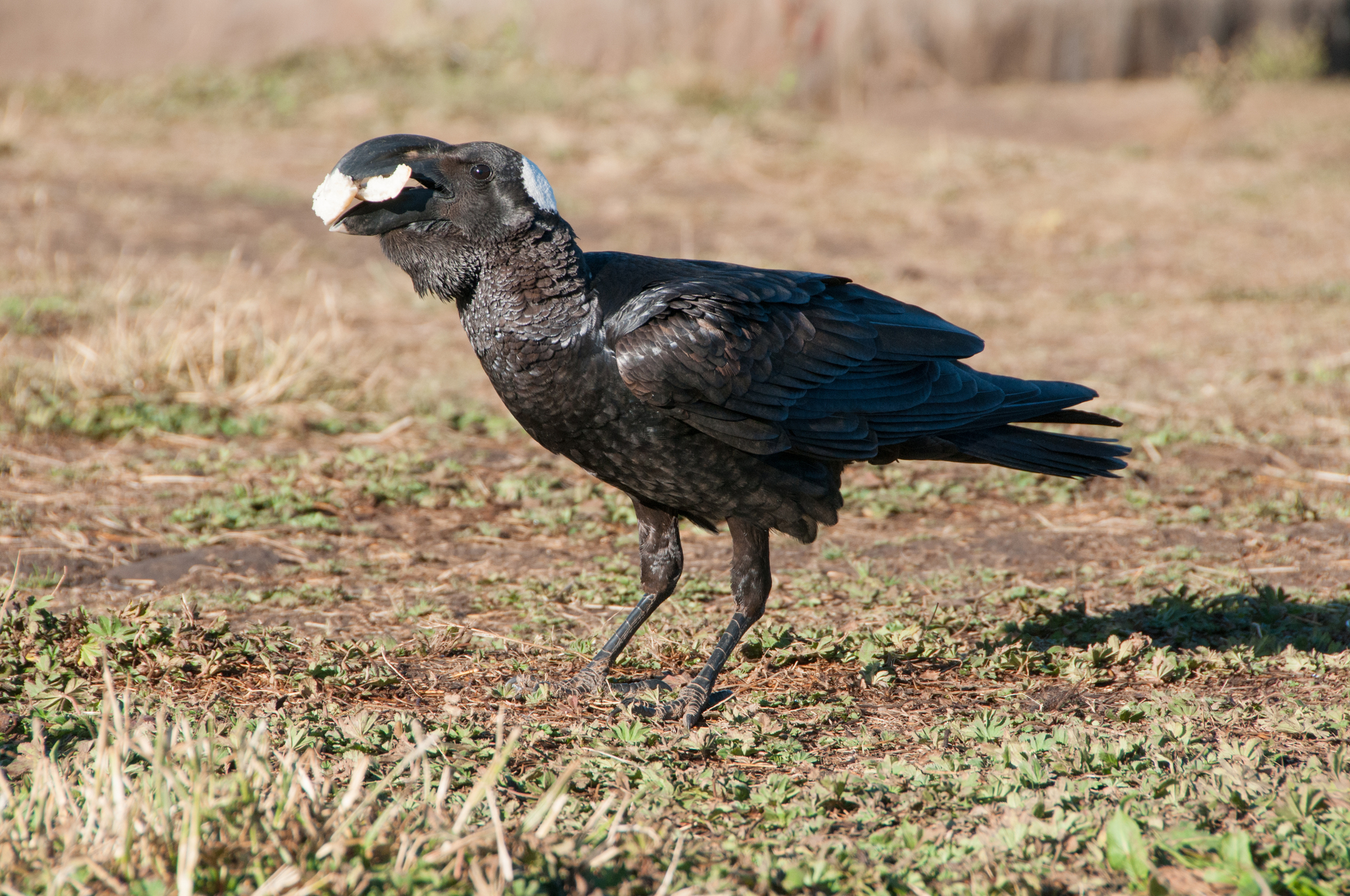
With food, in Ethiopia

Its calls include a harsh nasal croak, a low wheezy croak, a "raven-raven", and sometimes a "dink, dink, dink" sound. Like many corvids, the thick-billed raven is capable of vocal mimicry; however, this behaviour is rare in the wild, and is normally recorded only in captivity.

== Gallery ==
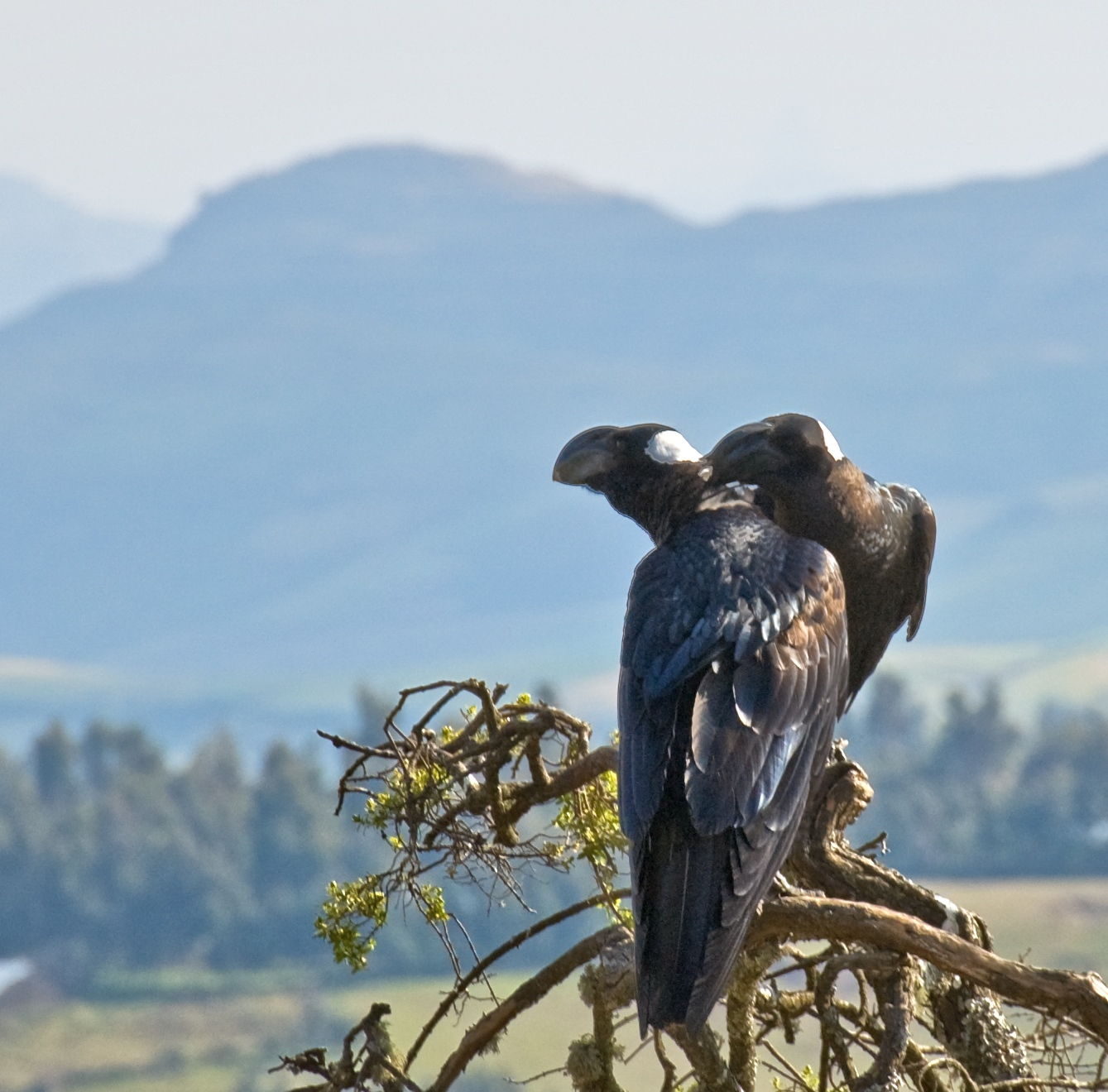
Thick-billed raven courtship, Simien Mountains, Ethiopia

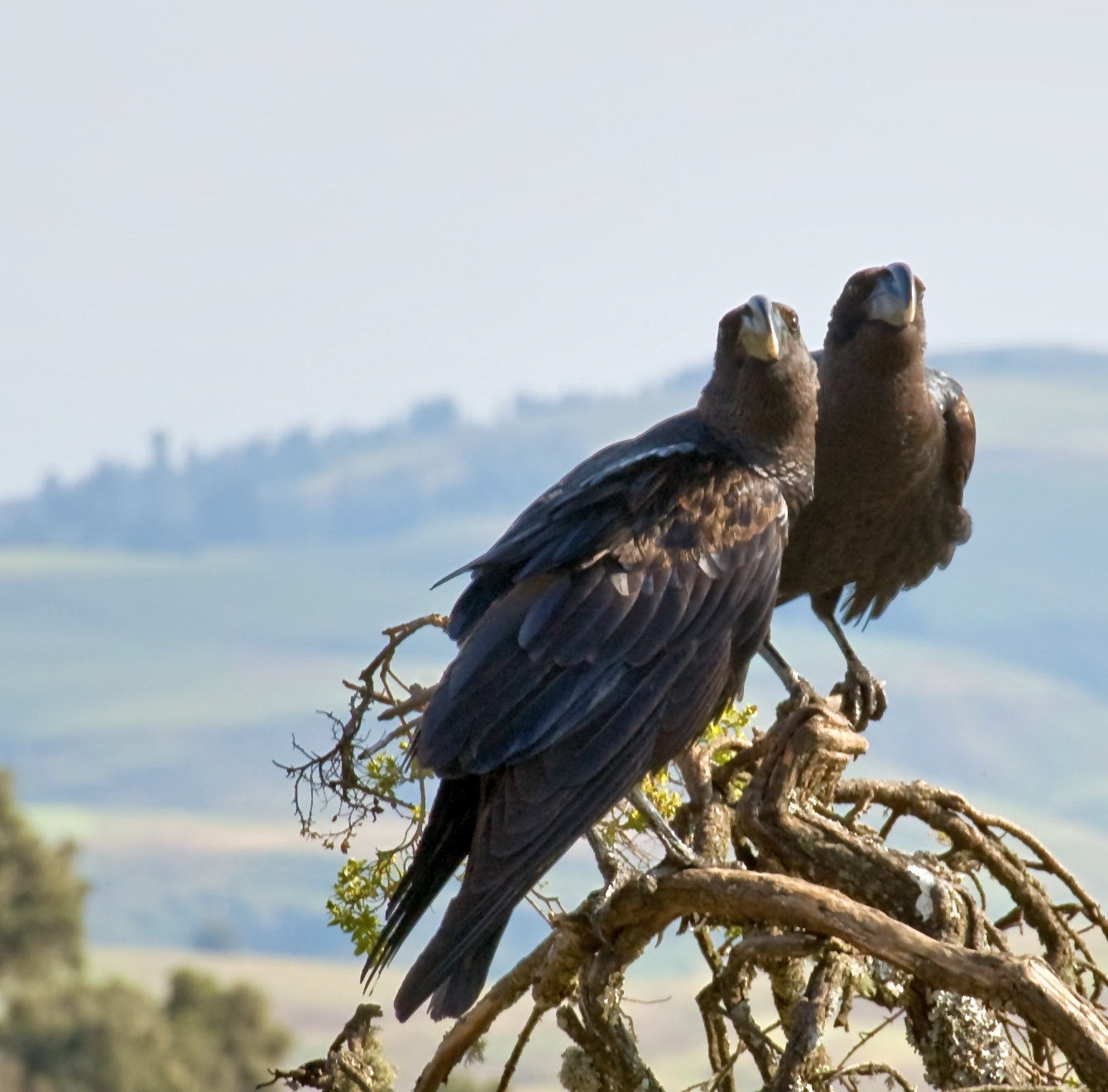
Thick-billed raven courtship, Simien Mountains, Ethiopia

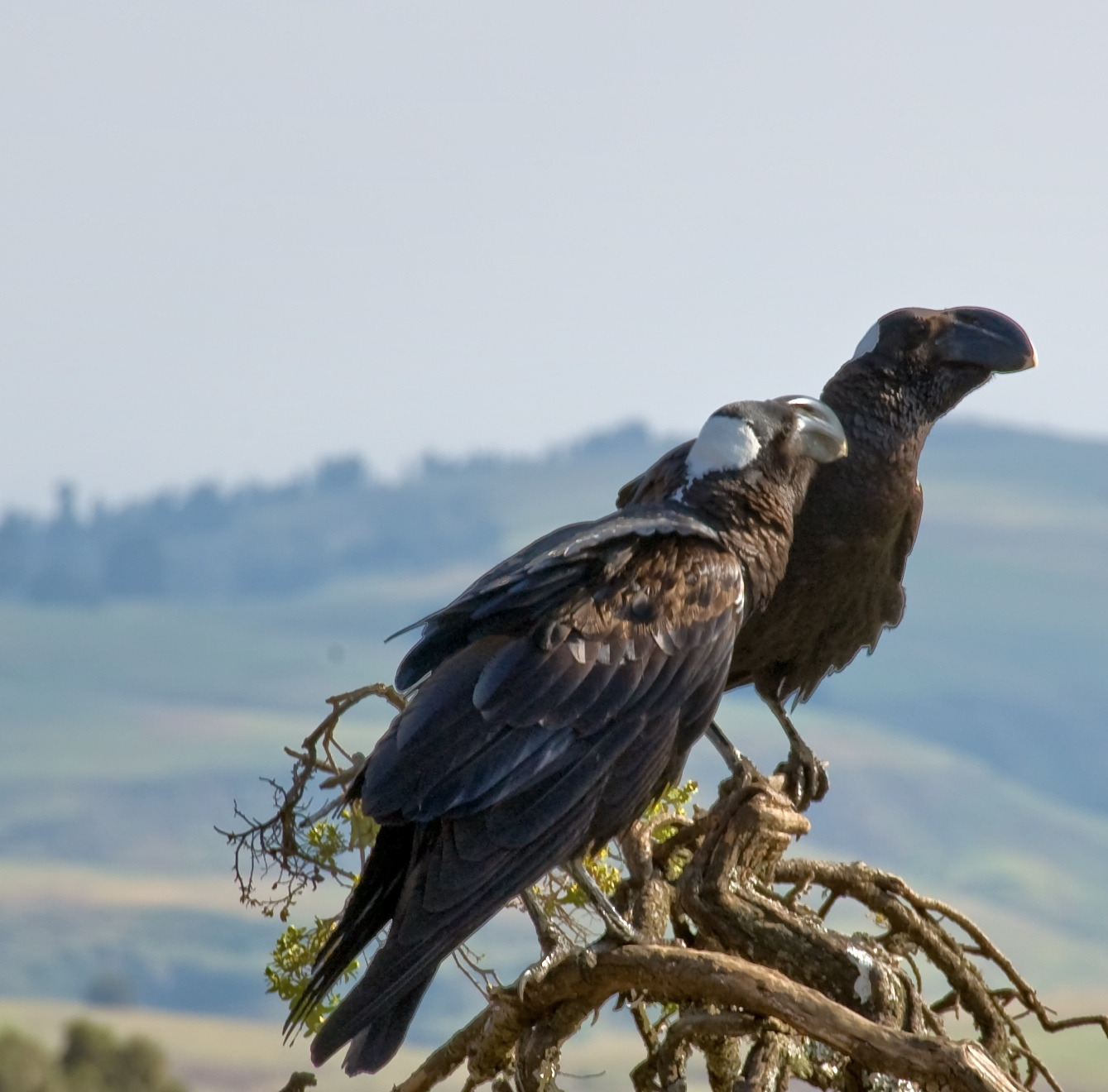
Thick-billed raven courtship, Simien Mountains, Ethiopia

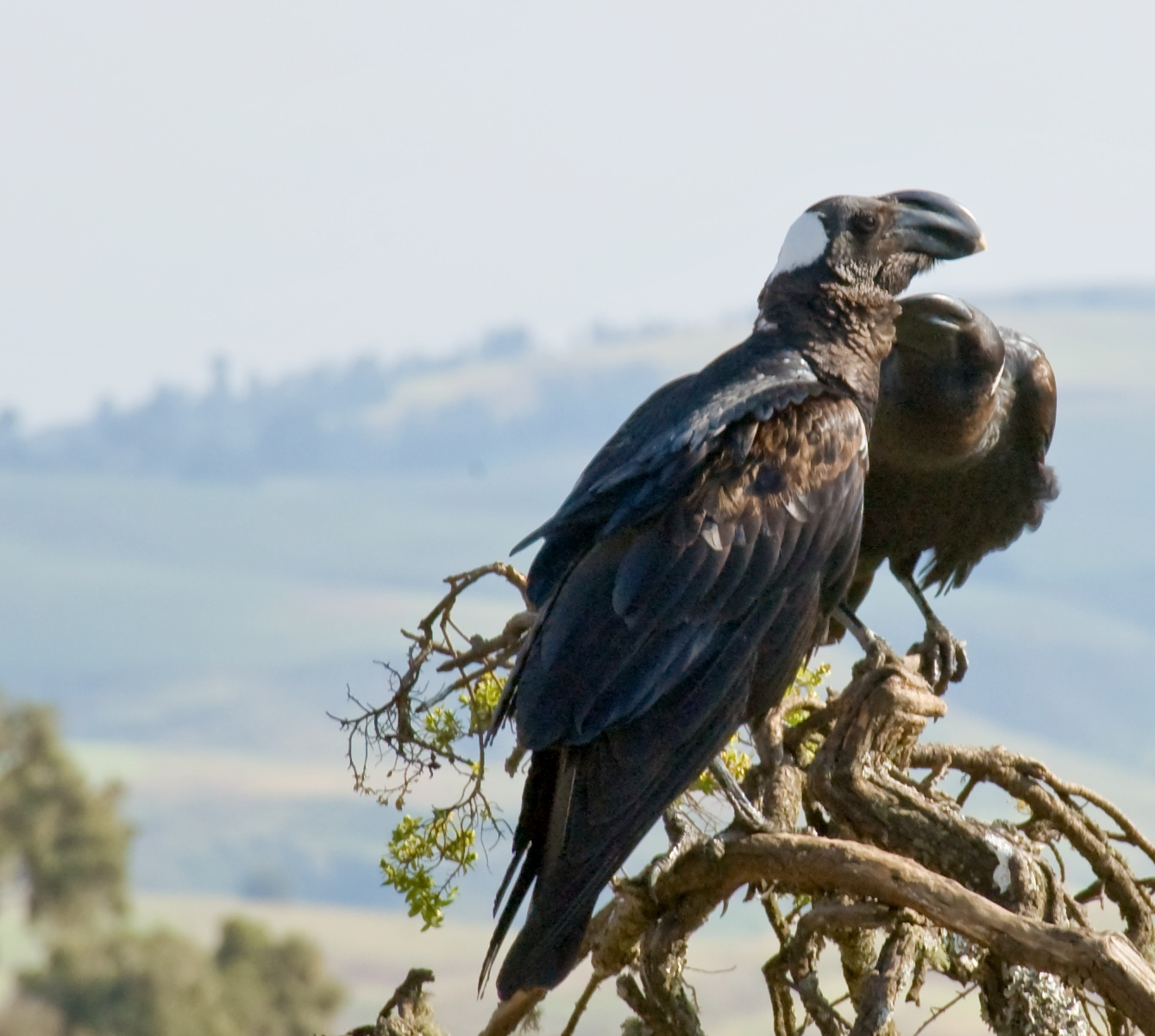
Thick-billed raven courtship, Simien Mountains, Ethiopia

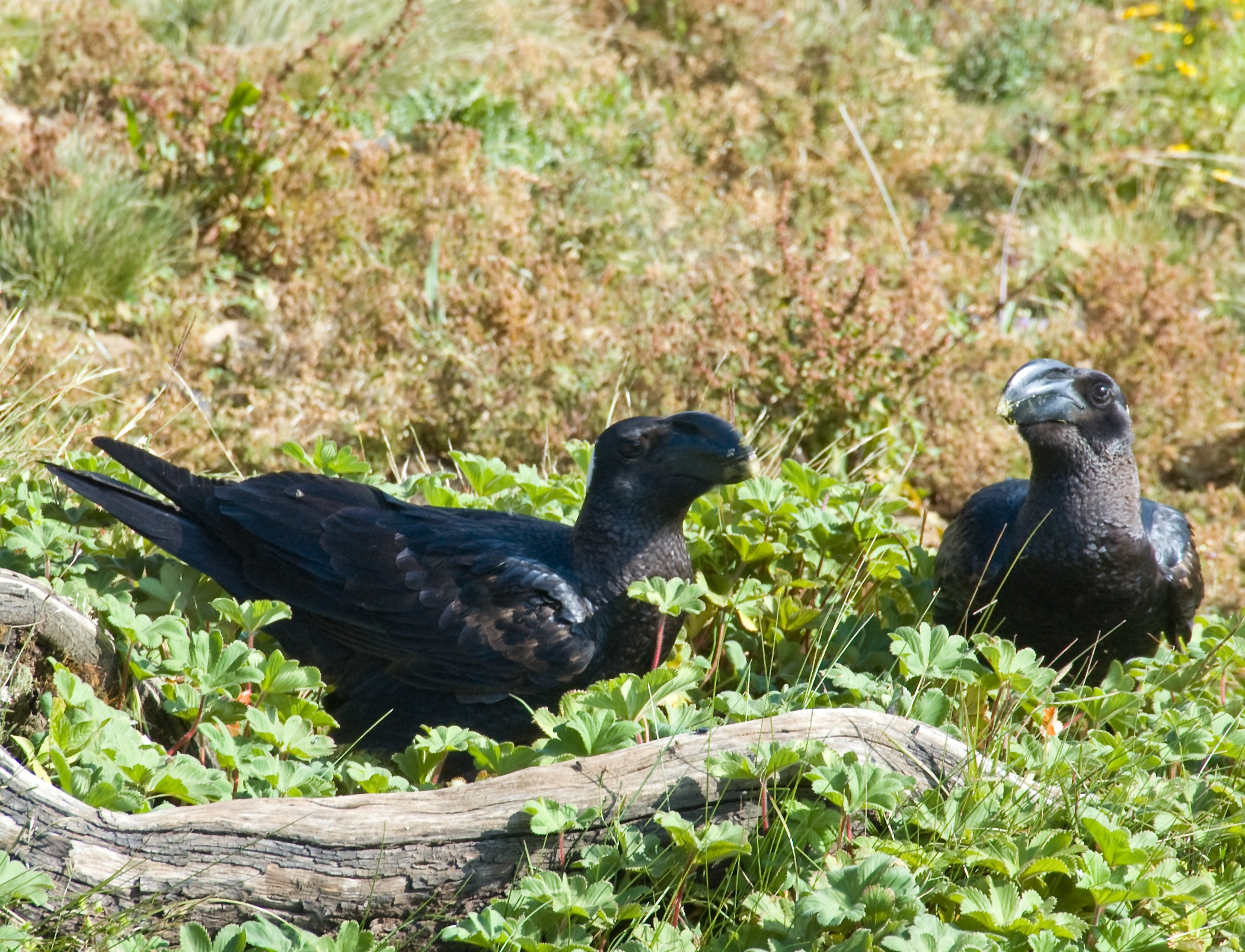
Thick-billed raven courtship, Simien Mountains, Ethiopia

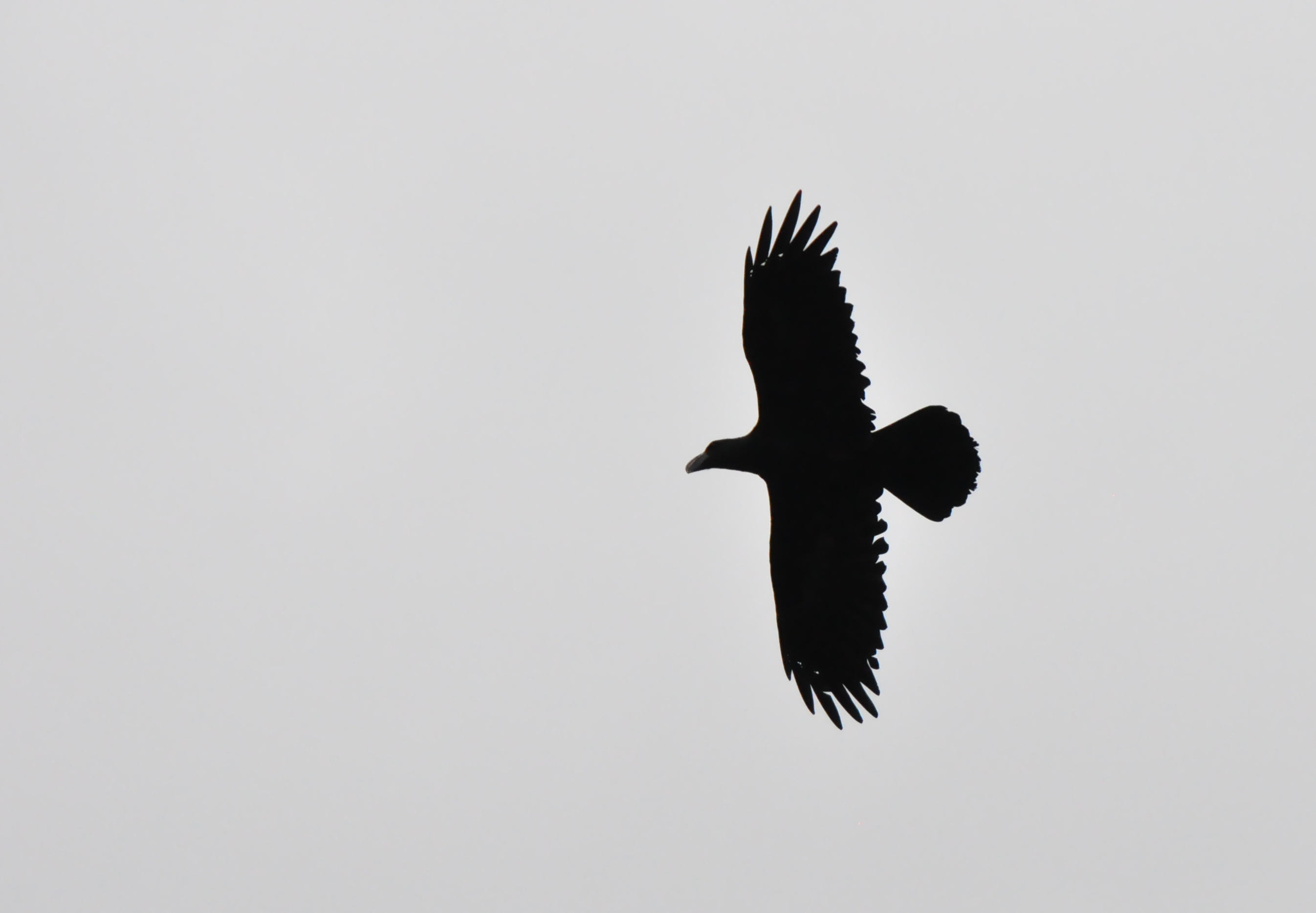
In flight

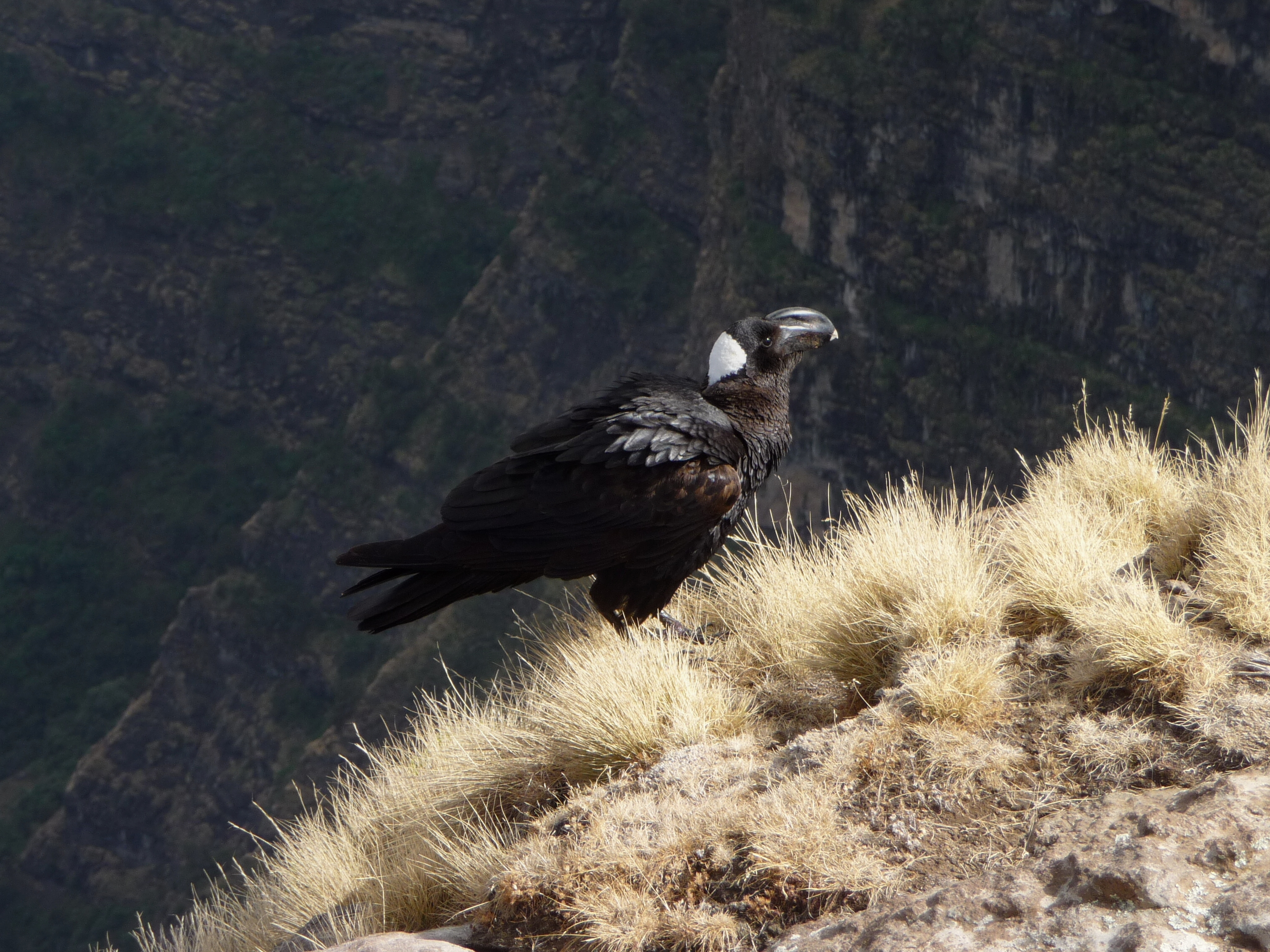

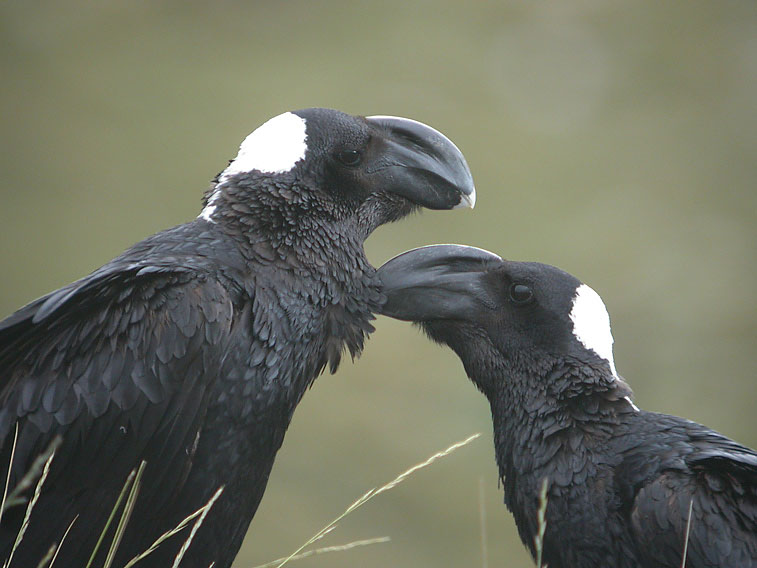
Preening

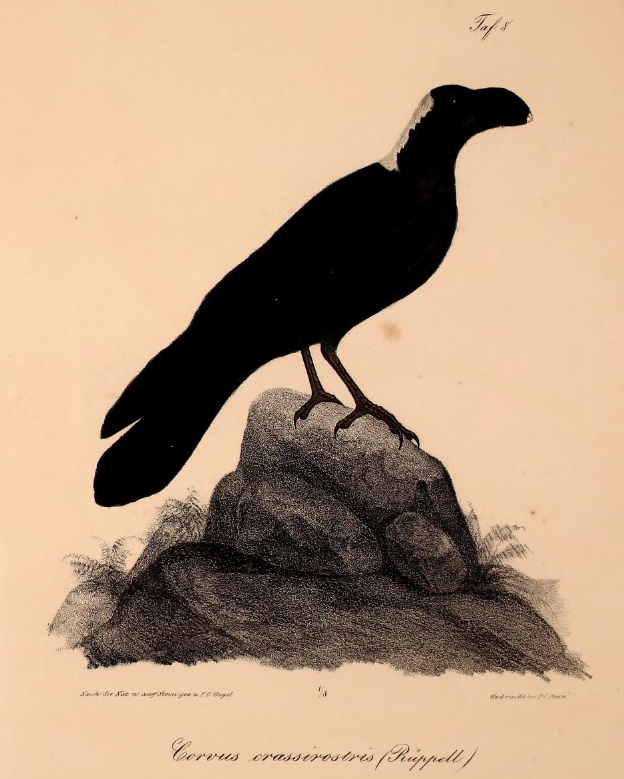
Rüppell's depiction of the species (1835)
