= Raven (given name) =

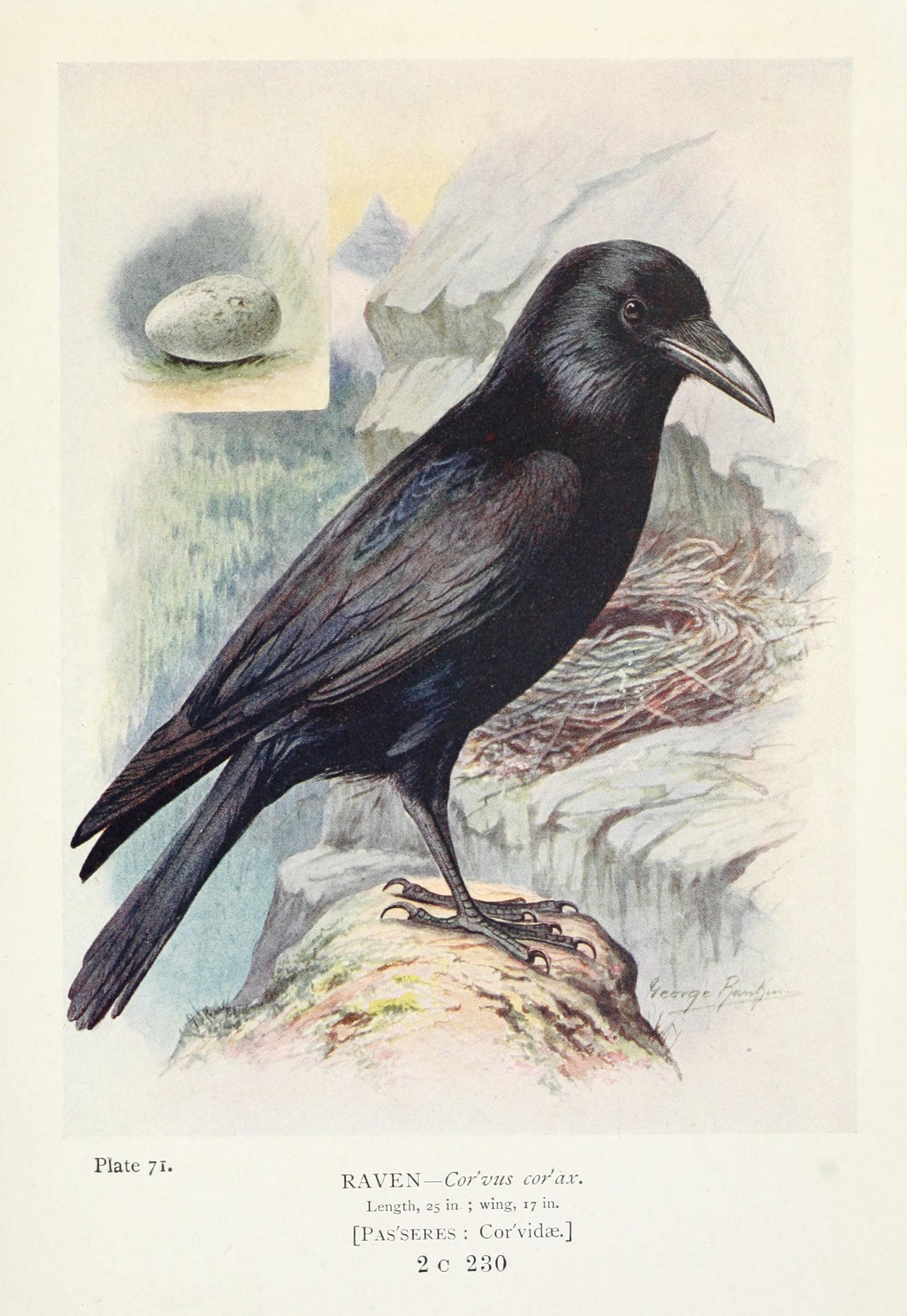
- A Common raven
- Pronunciation: /ˈreɪvən/
- Gender: Unisex
- Language: English

Origin
- Language: English
- Origin: "raven"

Other names
- Cognates: *Hræfn, Hrafn
- See also: Ravenna

Raven /ˈreɪvən/ is a given name in the English language. While it may be given to boys and girls, it is more frequently a feminine name. In the United States of America the name has ranked among the top 1,000 names given to baby girls since 1977.

== Etymology and related names ==
The word is the name of a bird, which is ultimately derived from the Old English hræfn. As a masculine name, Raven parallels the Old Norse Hrafn, and the Old English *Hræfn, which both mean "raven". As a feminine name Raven is among several names derived from birds such as Dove, Kestrel and Teal. Names derived from vocabulary words, such as the bird names mentioned, increased in popularity as feminine names in the English-speaking world during the 20th century. The feminine given name Ravenna is thought to be derived from the name of the northern Italian city Ravenna. However, in some cases Ravenna may also represent a more elaborately feminine form of Raven.

Raven is also a surname in the English language. In some cases the surname is derived from the Old Norse and Old English personal names already mentioned. The surname may also originate from a nickname meaning 'raven', or a thieving person, or a dark-haired person, derived from the Middle English raven. In other cases the surname is derived from a sign name. The following surnames are examples of names from which the modern surname Raven is derived: filius Reuene, in Yorkshire, 1086; le Reven, in Worcestershire, 1327; and atte Raven, in London, 1344. (This final surname is a sign name, which indicates that the bearer was someone who lived near a sign with a raven on it, possibly a house sign.) Raven is also a German surname derived from the Middle Low German rave, raven, meaning 'raven'. This surname originated as a nickname or from an old personal name.

== Cognates ==
Germanic-language names of the same word-origin

- *Hræfn – masculine – Old English (this name is unattested).
- *Hræfning – masculine – Old English (a derivative of *Hræfn).
- Hraban – masculine – a Germanic language name.
- Hrafn – masculine – Old Norse.
- HraƀnaR – masculine – early Old Norse.
- HarabanaR – masculine – early Old Norse.

Germanic-language names of the same meaning (and of non-Germanic origin)

- Corbin – masculine – English (a name with several possible origins; in some cases it may be derived from Corbinian, see below).
- Corbinian – masculine – English (possibly from Latin corvus, and Late Latin corbus, which mean "crow", "raven"). The name is possibly a translation of Germanic personal name of a similar meaning, such as Hraban.
- Korbinian – masculine – German (see above Corbinian which is the English form of this name).

Non-Germanic-language names with the same meaning

- Brân – masculine – Welsh (from Welsh brân, which means "raven").
- Bran – masculine – Irish (from Irish bran, which means "raven").
- Branán – masculine – Irish (meaning "little raven").
- Branagán – masculine – Irish (a double diminutive of bran, which means "raven").
- Feichín – masculine – Irish (a diminutive of Irish fiach, which means "raven").
- Fiachna – masculine – Irish (from fiach, which can mean both "raven" and "hunt").

== Popularity and use ==
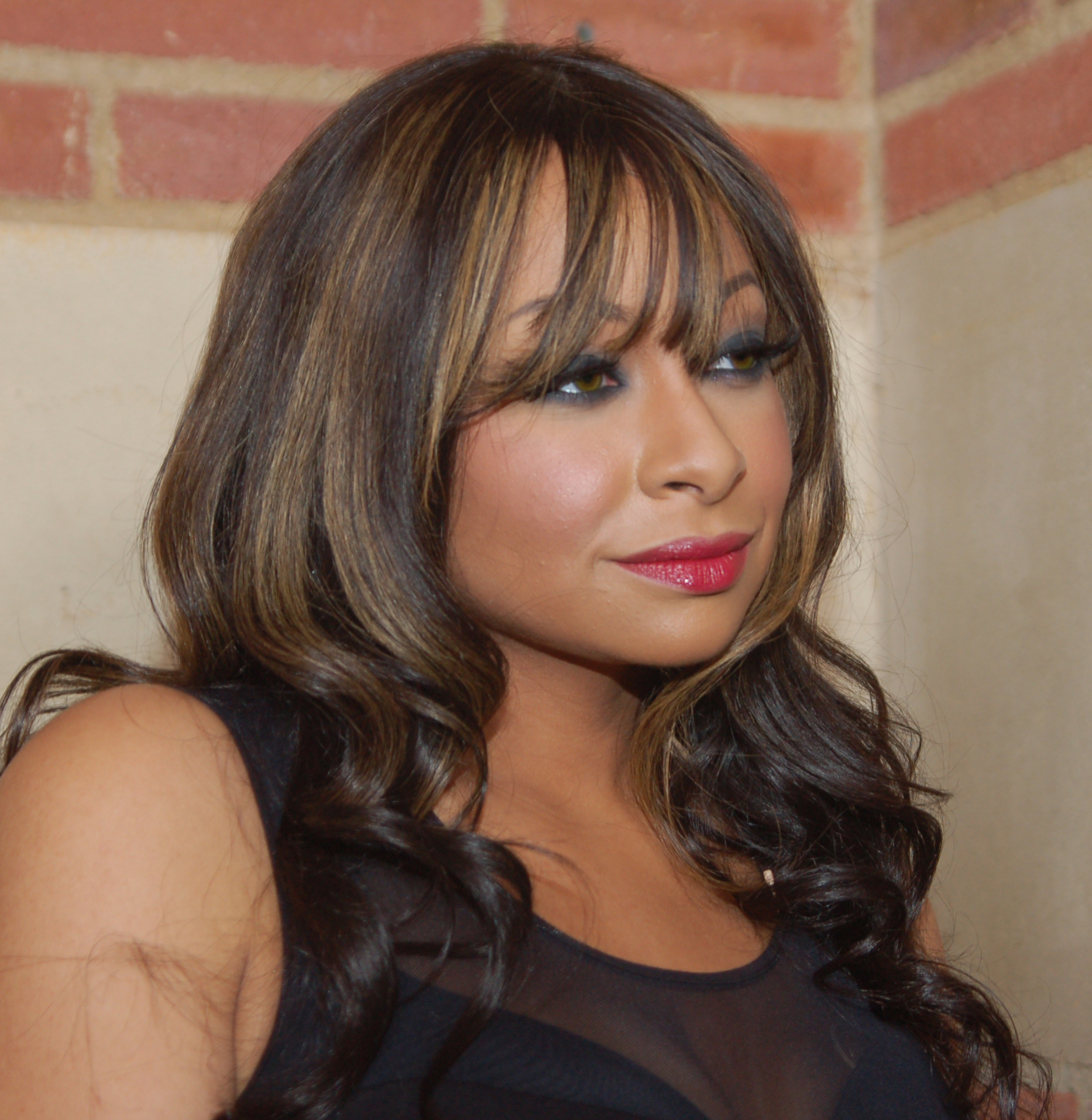
Raven-Symoné, American actress, singer, and director

In the United States of America and in Britain Raven is more commonly used as a feminine than a masculine name. The name has ranked amongst the top 1,000 feminine names recorded in Social Security card applications in the US since 1977. In 2009 it was the 636th most common feminine name. As a masculine name Raven ranked amongst the top 1,000 names only in the years 1997–2002. Its highest rank was in 1999, when it was ranked the 811th most common masculine name.

The name's increase in popularity in the US is potentially due to the fame of American actress Raven-Symoné. Between 1988 and 1993, usage of Raven as a girls' name increased from 327 to 2285 (+599%) in the US; the actress has been active since 1989.

In 1990 the United States Census Bureau undertook a study of the 1990 United States census and released a sample of data concerning the most popular names. This sample consisted of 6.3 million people and was made up of 5,494 unique first names (4,275 feminine names and 1,219 masculine names). Within this sample Raven was ranked the 1,358th most common feminine name and did not even rank amongst the 1,219 masculine names.

== Popularity charts ==
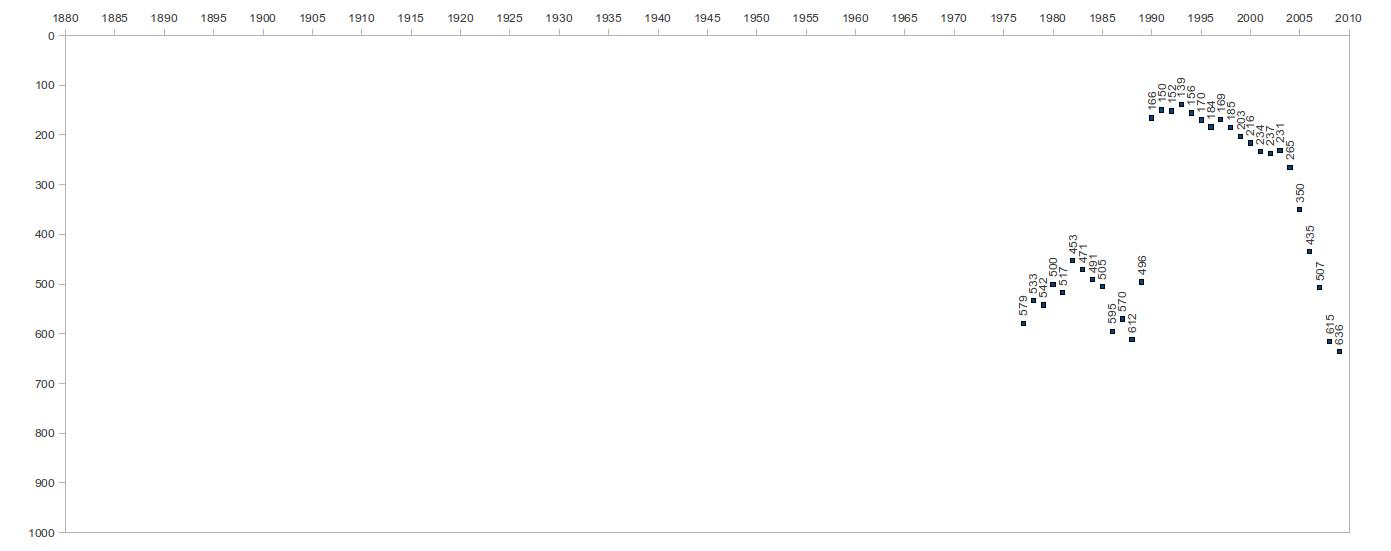
Popularity of Raven as a feminine name

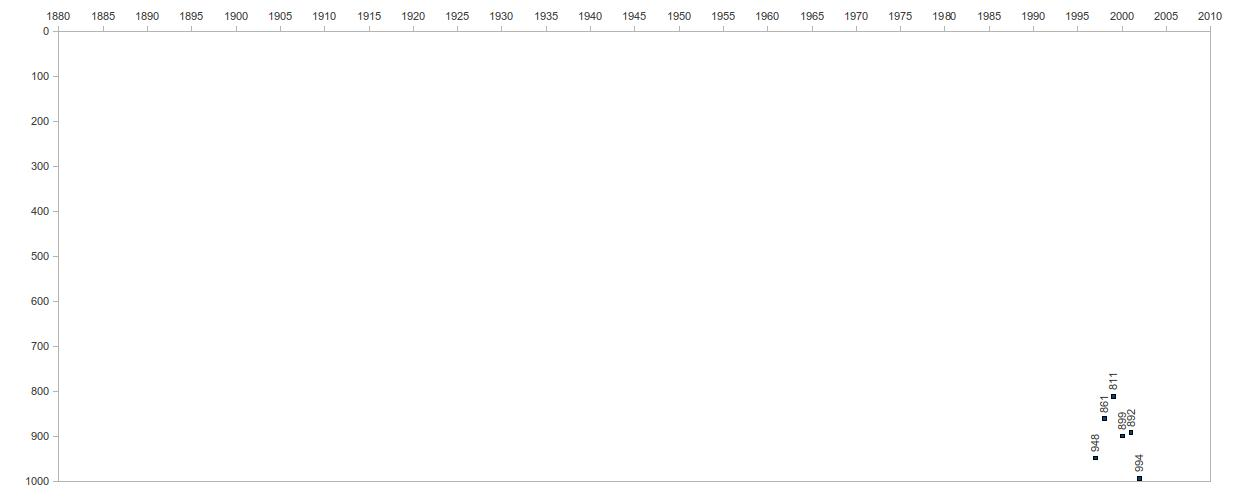
Popularity of Raven as a masculine name

The years and rank when Raven appeared amongst the top 1,000 names for Social Security card applications for boys or girls, in the United States of America.

== Women ==
- Raven Baxter, American science communicator and STEM educator
- Raven Bowens, American actress
- Raven Chapman (born 1994), English professional boxer
- Raven Clay (born 1990), American short hurdler
- Raven Dauda (born 1973), Canadian writer and actress
- Raven De La Croix (born 1947), American actress and stripper
- Raven Edwards-Dowdall (born 2000), Guyanese footballer
- Raven Goodwin, American actress
- Raven Hail (1921–2005), Cherokee writer
- Raven Halfmoon (born 1991), Caddo painter and sculptor
- Raven Harrison, American businesswoman and politician
- Raven Hiroka (born 1981), Japanese professional wrestler
- Raven Jackson (born 1990), American filmmaker and television writer
- Raven Johnson (born 2003), American basketball player
- Raven Leilani (born 1990), American writer
- Raven Oak (born 1977), American author and artist
- Raven Pearman-Maday (born 1985), American actress, singer, and director
- Raven Quinn, American musician, singer, and songwriter
- Raven Riley, Italian-American pornographic actress
- Raven Sinclair, Canadian child welfare critic and professor
- Raven Tao, Eurasian model, media personality and entrepreneur
- Raven B. Varona (born 1990), American photographer
- Raven Villanueva (born 1979), Filipino actress
- Raven Walton, American cinematographer
- Raven Wilkinson (1935–2018), American dancer

== Men ==
- Raven Barber (born 1991), American professional basketball player
- Raven Bush, Member rock band Syd Arthur
- Raven Chacon (born 1977), American composer, musician and artist
- Raven Gonzales (born 2002), Filipino professional basketball player
- Raven Greene (born 1995), American professional football safety
- Raven Grimassi (1951–2019), American author
- Raven Klaasen (born 1982), South African professional tennis player
- Raven Kumar Krishnasamy, Malaysian politician
- Raven Maize (born 1964), American DJ and music producer
- Raven Metzner, American screenwriter and producer
- Raven c.s. McCracken, American game designer and author
- Raven I. McDavid Jr. (1911–1984), American linguist
- Raven Mimura, American artist
- Raven Sturt (born 1993), American chess grandmaster
- Raven Freiherr von Barnekow (1897–1941), German World War I flying ace credited with eleven aerial victories

== Non-binary ==
- Raven Davis (born 1975), Ojibwe artist and activist
- Raven Saunders (born 1995), American track and field athlete
- Raven van Dorst (born 1984), Dutch singer, television presenter, actor and podcaster
