= Hrefna =

Hrefna is an Icelandic given name, the female version of the name Hrafn. One of the officially approved given names in Iceland.

Matronyms:

- Hrefnuson (male)
- Hrefnudóttir (female)

== People with the name ==
- Hrefna Björk Sverrisdóttir (born 1981), Icelandic businesswoman
- Hrefna Huld Jóhannesdóttir (born 1980), Icelandic footballer
- Hrefna Ingimarsdóttir (1931–2005), Icelandic athletics coach
- Hrefna Sigurjónsdóttir (born 1950), Icelandic academic
- Hrefna, fictionary character in Vikings: Valhalla, see Vikings: Valhalla#Recurring
