= Mind of the Raven =

1999 book on ravens by Bernd Heinrich

Mind of the Raven: Investigations and Adventures with Wolf-Birds
- First edition
- Author: Bernd Heinrich
- Language: English
- Subject: Animal behaviour, Common raven
- Published: 1999 (HarperCollins)
- Publication place: United States
- Media type: Print (hardback)
- Pages: 380
- ISBN: 0060174471
- OCLC: 40734913
- Dewey Decimal: 598.864
- LC Class: QL696.P2367 H445 2006
- Website: https://www.harpercollins.com/products/mind-of-the-raven-bernd-heinrich?variant=32122736476194

Mind of the Raven: Investigations and Adventures with Wolf-Birds is a 1999 book by Bernd Heinrich. Heinrich tells about the process and findings of his long-term researches into raven cognition, offering an "admittedly incomplete if anecdotally rich" portrait of the species.
