= Ravens in Winter =

1989 book by Bernd Heinrich

- First edition
- Author: Bernd Heinrich
- Illustrator: Bernd Heinrich
- Language: English
- Subject: Animal behaviour, Common raven, Scientific method
- Published: 1989 (Summit Books)
- Publication place: United States
- Media type: Print (Hardback)
- Pages: 379
- ISBN: 9780671678098
- OCLC: 19886833

Ravens in Winter is a 1989 book by Bernd Heinrich. It is a study of the behaviour of ravens in the forests of Maine.

== Reception ==
A review of Ravens in Winter by Publishers Weekly wrote "The story related here, which is constructed from his [Heinrich's] field notes, moves slowly; we learn a good deal about scientific methods and a lot about patience. Overall, however, the book is suspenseful and exciting." A New Scientist review summarised the book concluding "It also contains Heinrich's own—and excellent—drawings of the various raven postures, a comprehensive review of the literature, beginning with the Bible, and even a section of the ravens of the Tower of London."

It was an Evergreen Audubon & Nature Center Book of the Month.

Ravens in Winter has also been reviewed by AudioFile, Scientific American, The Condor, The Sewanee Review, and Library Journal.
