= One Man's Owl =

1987 book by Bernd Heinrich

- Cover
- Author: Bernd Heinrich
- Illustrator: Bernd Heinrich
- Language: English
- Subject: Natural history, Ornithology, Animal behavior
- Genre: Popular science, Nature writing
- Publisher: Princeton University Press
- Publication date: 1987
- Publication place: United States
- Pages: 240
- ISBN: 0-691-08470-X (hardcover, first edition)

One Man's Owl is a 1987 non-fiction book by biologist Bernd Heinrich documenting his three-year relationship with a great horned owl (Bubo virginianus) in the Maine wilderness. Originally published by Princeton University Press and later issued in an abridged edition revised by Alice Calaprice in 1993, the book presents Heinrich's diary-format observations of a nestling owl he rescued after a storm destroyed its nest in Vermont. The narrative follows the owl, named Bubo, from helpless nestling to independent predator, recording his development, hunting behavior, and interactions with other species while living in a semi-wild state around Heinrich's cabin at Camp Kaflunk. Heinrich, a professor of biology at the University of Vermont, combined personal observations with scientific literature to document the owl's maturation, prey recognition, territorial behavior, and the mobbing responses of other birds to the owl's presence. The first edition was chosen as a book club selection by the Nature Book Society and the Library of Science.

== Summary ==
The book chronicles the relationship between biologist Bernd Heinrich and a great horned owl (Bubo virginianus) he names Bubo, spanning three years in the Maine wilderness. Written in diary form, the narrative begins when Heinrich discovers a nestling owl on snow-covered ground in a Vermont pine forest after a storm destroyed its nest. Rationalizing that a study of the ontogeny of owl hunting behavior would justify his rescue in the eyes of the law, Heinrich takes the owlet into his care. The narrative follows Bubo's development from a helpless nestling to an independent predator, documenting Heinrich's observations of the owl's behavioral traits and maturation process.

The early sections detail Bubo's initial weeks in Heinrich's house, where the owl learns basic coordination and exhibits innate hunting responses through play-pouncing on inanimate objects before he can even fly. Heinrich then transports Bubo to Camp Kaflunk, his rustic cabin in the Maine woods, where the owl begins to explore his surroundings while maintaining the cabin as his base. As Bubo develops his flying abilities and gains freedom to roam the surrounding forest, Heinrich documents his hunting attempts, feeding behaviors, and territorial establishment. The author feeds Bubo primarily on roadkills collected during his daily runs, supplemented by prey caught by the cabin's resident cat, while observing how the owl learns to distinguish between potential prey and non-prey items.

A significant portion of the narrative explores mobbing behavior, as Heinrich raises two crows, Theo and Thor, to study their interactions with Bubo. These observations reveal complex dynamics between predator and prey species, with the crows exhibiting both instinctive and learned responses to the owl's presence. Heinrich documents how various bird species react differently to Bubo, from aggressive mobbing by blue jays protecting their nests to complete indifference by migrating warblers. The volume details numerous experiments and observations regarding Bubo's hunting techniques, prey recognition, caching behavior, and territorial defense, including his aggressive responses to human visitors whom he perceives as threats to his territory.

As the narrative progresses through the summers, Heinrich describes Bubo's increasing independence and decreasing reliance on provided food. The owl develops sophisticated hunting skills, successfully captures various prey, and establishes dominance over his territory around the cabin. The relationship between Heinrich and Bubo evolves from one of caretaker and dependent to a more distant association, with Bubo visiting primarily for food rather than companionship. Throughout the work, Heinrich enriches his personal observations with information from scientific literature on great horned owl biology, including discussions of their diet, anatomical specializations, breeding patterns, and molting strategies. The chronicle concludes with Heinrich's departure from the woods at summer's end and Bubo's transition to complete independence.

In an afterword added to the abridged edition, Heinrich reports possible subsequent sightings of Bubo, including an encounter by his nephew while grouse hunting near Jefferson, Maine, and another sighting in Camden three years after their last meeting, though neither can be definitively confirmed as the same owl.

== Reviews ==
Marcy F. Lawton thought the work reads like a thriller that presents substantial scientific information while capturing the personal wonder that lures people into the sciences. Lawton praised Heinrich's writing ability and descriptive prowess, citing his account of owl bathing behavior as an example. She appreciated how the author's wit and affection colored his accounts without introducing naive anthropomorphism or maudlin sentimentality, noting Heinrich's awareness of when he projects human characteristics onto the owl. Lawton thought that this volume represents the epitome of what popular science should be and would help elevate such efforts from what Sarah Blaffer Hrdy once termed the not very respectable demi-monde of popular science writing.

Stanley A. Temple thought that while few can resist rescuing apparently orphaned baby birds, few of these rescued birds, including Heinrich's owl, are actually orphans. Temple described the work as a chronicle of Heinrich's three-year effort to coach the owl to independence and an accessible description of owl behavior. While he thought the book was not a definitive ethogram, Temple identified the sections on mobbing and the ontogeny of hunting behavior as particularly worthwhile contributions to science, though observing that in many cases the author reinvents the wheel. Temple suggested the book's value to professionals lay in its insights into using tame, free-ranging animals for behavioral studies, a technique he considered underused despite having produced important contributions, with Lorenz's work as the archetype.

Mark Riegner described the volume as a delightful personal account of Heinrich's trials and tribulations in raising an owl and unraveling its biological mysteries. Riegner mentioned how the chronological narrative details the owl's growth and development during three summers in the Maine woods, affording Heinrich the opportunity to study semi-wild animal behavior from close quarters with minimal observer disturbance. Reigner valued how descriptions of the owl were interwoven with referenced passages on great horned owl biology stufying diet, hunting behavior, anatomical specializations, breeding, and molting. Riegner considered the work entertaining and educational, and handsomely illustrated.

In her review, Anne Perry said that Heinrich fulfills a not uncommon urge to become intimate with one of nature's wild ones through his account of raising the nestling owl through its three-year maturation. Perry emphasized the substantial commitment involved, observing that Heinrich was on duty twenty-four hours daily, providing a vivid example of him waking in panic about fishing line that might entangle the owl. She situated the work within shifting scientific attitudes toward animal cognition, referencing Donald Griffin's 1976 The Question of Animal Awareness and the subsequent interest in animal consciousness. Perry observed that Heinrich's descriptions of owl food caching suggested conscious intention. She welcomed how Heinrich provides an intimate picture of owl life without abandoning scholarship, noting that the work also encompasses the owl's interactions with its surroundings, particularly through Heinrich's parallel raising of two crows to study mobbing behavior.

A. H. B. from the American Ornithologists' Union characterized Heinrich as a first-rate biologist, author, and observer who writes well about natural history. The reviewer described this as Heinrich's most personal book covering three summers with the owl Bubo, emphasizing that it documents the owl's growth but more importantly reflects the author's curiosity, feelings, and thoughts. A. H. B. noted the wide-ranging discourse, quoting Heinrich's observation that biology teaches broadmindedness because different hypotheses are simultaneously true to varying degrees in each species. The reviewer praised Heinrich's intellectual and physical discipline, noting his sparse writing style and mentioning his former 100-mile running record, concluding that this discipline shows in writing that reflects deep sensitivity to surrounding life.
