= Hrafn =

Male given name

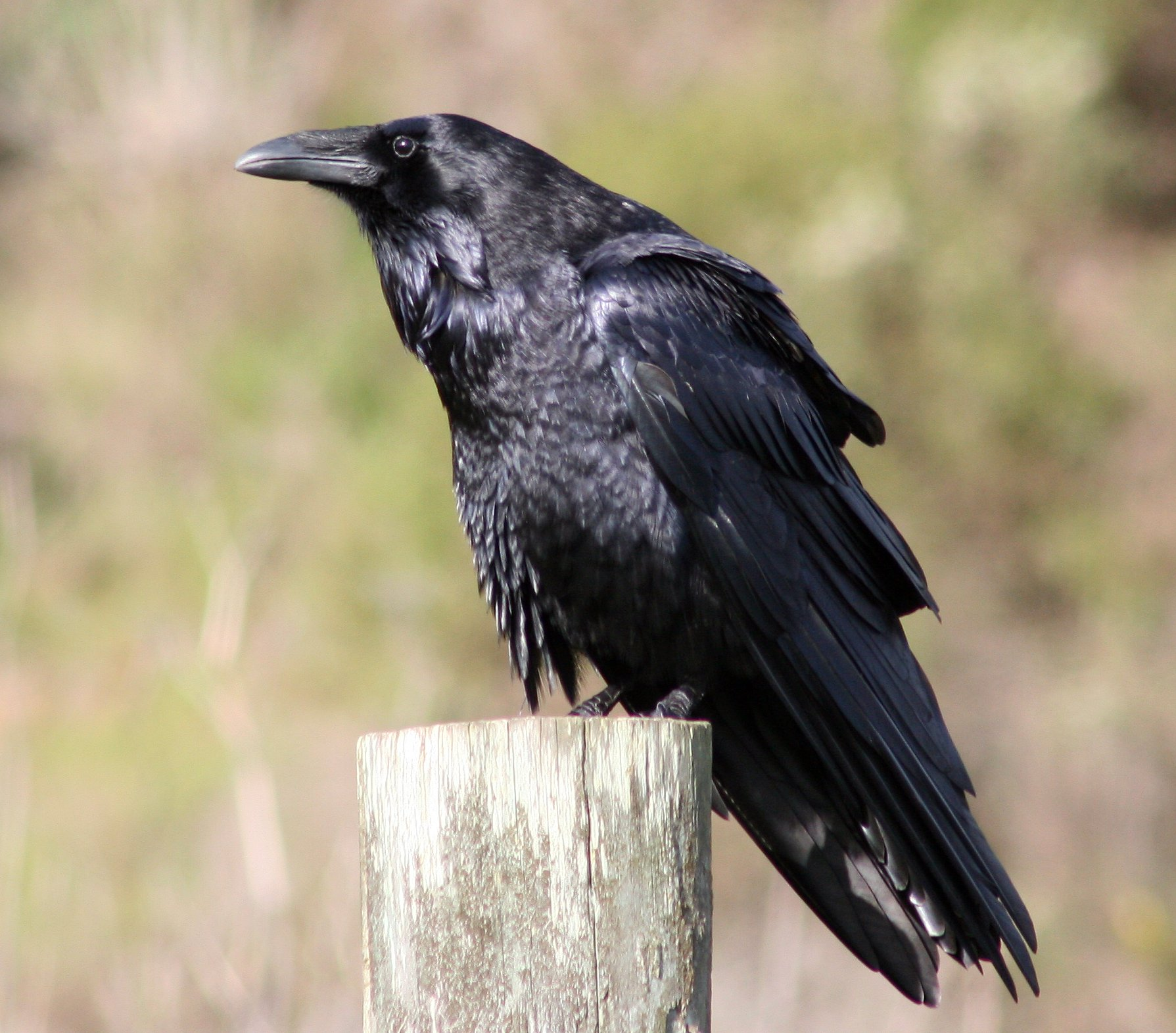
- A common raven.
- Gender: Masculine
- Language: Old Norse

Origin
- Language: Old Norse
- Meaning: "raven"

Other names
- Cognates: *Hræfn, Raven

Hrafn (Old Norse pronunciation: [ˈhrɑvn]; Icelandic pronunciation: [ˈr̥apn̥]) is both a masculine byname, and personal name in Old Norse. The name translates into English as "raven". The Old English form of the name is *Hræfn. The name is paralleled by the English masculine given name Raven, which is derived from the word "raven". The feminine form of this name is Hrefna.

== People with the name ==
- Einar Hrafn Stefánsson (born 1992), member of an Icelandic musical group Hatari
- Hrafn Kristjánsson (born 1972), Icelandic basketball coach and player
- Hrafn Gunnlaugsson (born 1948), Icelandic film director
- Hrafn Haengsson (fl. 10th century), Icelandic jurist and goði
- Hrafna-Flóki Vilgerðarson (born 9th century), first Norseman to deliberately sail to Iceland
