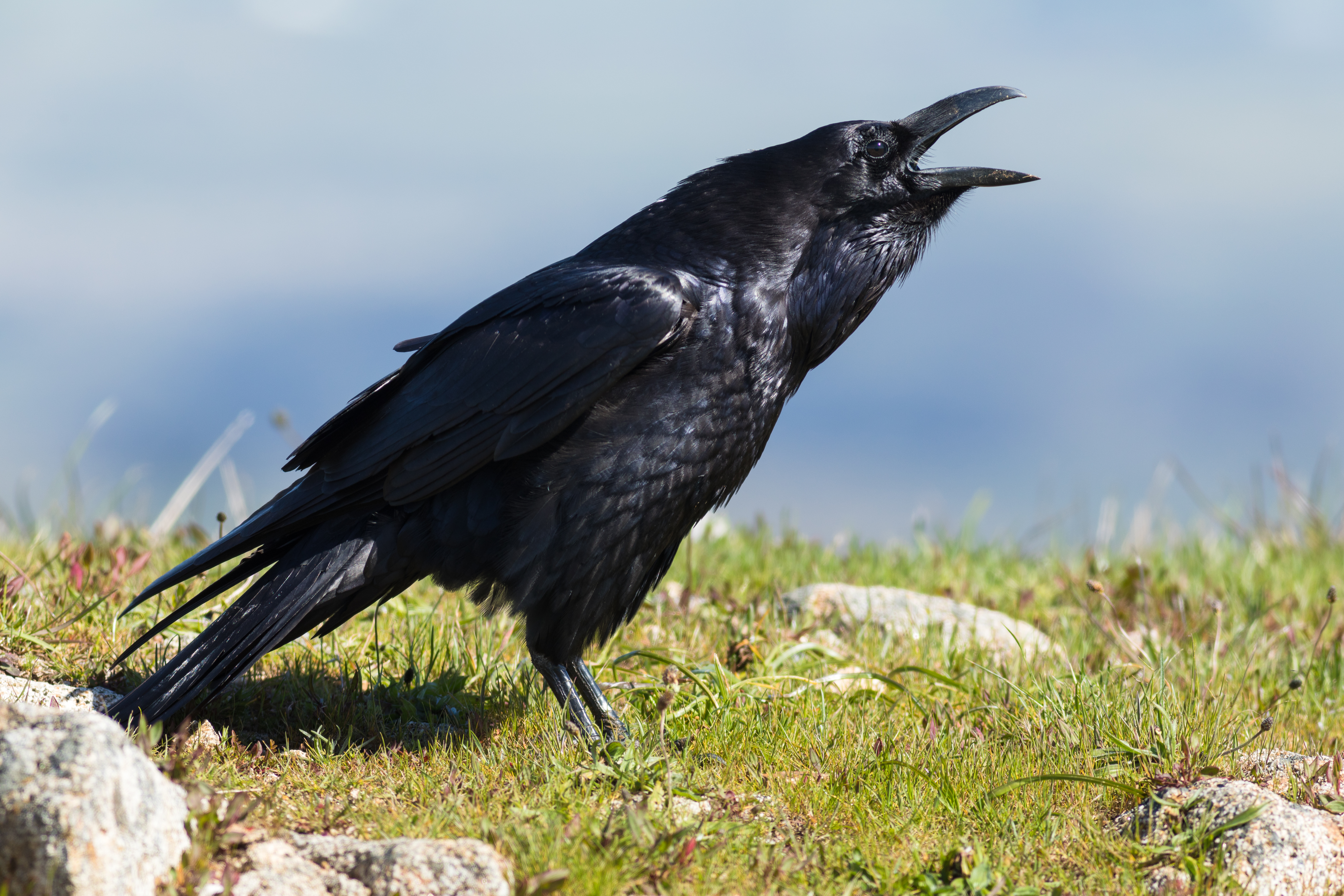
- Corvus corax clarionensis, California
- Corvus corax pricipalis pair, Eastern British Columbia

Conservation status
- Least Concern (IUCN 3.1)

- Secure (NatureServe)

Scientific classification
- Kingdom: Animalia
- Phylum: Chordata
- Class: Aves
- Order: Passeriformes
- Family: Corvidae
- Genus: Corvus
- Species: C. corax

Binomial name
- Corvus corax Linnaeus, 1758

Subspecies
- 8–11, see Subspecies
- Common raven range Breeding Resident Non-breeding

Audio
- Calls of C. c. corax in Exeter

= Common raven =

Common raven Temporal range: Middle Pleistocene–Recent

Large, black species of passerine bird

The common raven or northern raven (Corvus corax) is a large all-black passerine bird. It is the most widely distributed of all corvids, found across the Northern Hemisphere. There are 11 accepted subspecies with little variation in appearance, although recent research has demonstrated significant genetic differences among populations from various regions. It is one of the two largest corvids, alongside the thick-billed raven, and is the heaviest passerine bird; at maturity, the common raven averages 63 centimetres (25 inches) in length and 1.47 kilograms (3.2 pounds) in weight, up to 2 kg (4.4 lb) in the heaviest individuals. Although their typical lifespan is considerably shorter, common ravens can live more than 23 years in the wild. Young birds may travel in flocks but later mate for life, with each mated pair defending a territory.

Common ravens have coexisted with humans for thousands of years and in some areas have been so numerous that people have regarded them as pests. Part of their success as a species is due to their omnivorous diet; they are extremely versatile and opportunistic in finding sources of nutrition, feeding on carrion, insects, cereal grains, berries, fruit, small animals, nesting birds, and food waste. Some notable feats of problem-solving provide evidence that the common raven is unusually intelligent.

Over the centuries, the raven has been the subject of mythology, folklore, art, and literature. In many cultures, including the indigenous cultures of Scandinavia, ancient Ireland and Wales, Bhutan, the northwest coast of North America, and Siberia and northeast Asia, the common raven has been revered as a spiritual figure or godlike creature.

== Taxonomy ==
The common raven was one of the many species originally described, with its type locality given as Europe, by Carl Linnaeus in his landmark 1758 10th edition of Systema Naturae, and it still bears its original name of Corvus corax. It is the type species of the genus Corvus.

=== Etymology ===
The genus Corvus is derived from the Latin word for 'raven'. The specific epithet corax is the Latinized form of the Greek word κόραξ, meaning 'raven' or 'crow'.

The modern English word raven has cognates in many other Germanic languages, including Old Norse (and subsequently modern Icelandic) hrafn and Old High German (h)raban, all which descend from Proto-Germanic *hrabanaz. An old Scottish word corby or corbie, akin to the French corbeau, has been used for both this bird and the carrion crow. Collective nouns for a group of ravens (or at least the common raven) include "unkindness" and "conspiracy".

=== Subspecies ===
Most authorities, including the IOC World Bird List and the Handbook of the Birds of the World (HBW), currently accept 11 subspecies, though some only accept eight; of the six subspecies accepted by IOC and HBW in the Western Palearctic region, only four are accepted by Shirihai.

Scientific name	Image	Distribution	Notes
Corvus corax principalis Ridgway, 1887	Kootenay National Park, BC, Canada	Northern North America and Greenland, south to the Appalachian Mountains in the east	Large body and the largest bill, its plumage is strongly glossy, and its throat hackles are well-developed.
Corvus corax sinuatus Wagler, 1829	Bryce Canyon, Utah, US	South-central North America from SW Canada through the western US (except California) and Mexico (except Baja California) to Central America	Smaller, with a smaller and narrower bill than C. c. principalis.
Corvus corax clarionensis Rothschild & E. J. O. Hartert, 1902	Bodega Head, California, US	Far southwestern US (California) and northwestern Mexico (Baja California and the Revillagigedo Islands)	Populations in this area are the smallest ravens in North America. They are sometimes included in C. c. sinuatus, but are genetically distinct from that and other subspecies, more closely related to the chihuahuan raven C. cryptoleucus (see Evolutionary history, below).
Corvus corax varius Brünnich, 1764	Akureyri, Iceland	Iceland and the Faroe Islands	Less glossy than C. c. principalis or the nominate subspecies C. c. corax, is intermediate in size, and the bases of its neck feathers are whitish (not visible at a distance). An extinct pied colour morph found only on the Faroe Islands was known as the pied raven (C. c. varius morpha leucophaeus; the black colour morph being C. c. varius morpha varius).
Corvus corax corax Linnaeus, 1758	Gothenburg, Sweden	Northern and central Europe eastwards to Lake Baikal, south to the Caucasus region and northern Iran	Large, with a relatively short, arched bill.
Corvus corax hispanus E. J. O. Hartert & O. Kleinschmidt, 1901	Pyrenees in Catalonia, Spain	Southwestern Europe from Iberia to Italy, and including the Balearic Islands, Corsica and Sardinia	An even more arched bill and shorter wings than the nominate. Some authors include it in nominate C. c. corax.
Corvus corax laurencei Hume, 1873	Desert National Park, Rajasthan, India	Across southern Asia from Turkey and Cyprus east to western China and northwestern India; in the Indian subcontinent only at low altitudes, below 600 m (cf. C. c. tibetanus, over 2,500 m). Birds in eastern Greece in southeast Europe are also included in this subspecies by some authors, but others include them in nominate C. c. corax.	Slightly larger than the nominate subspecies, but has relatively short throat hackles. Its plumage is generally all black, though its neck and breast have a brownish tone similar to that of the brown-necked raven; this is more evident when the plumage is worn. The bases of its neck feathers, although somewhat variable in colour, are often almost whitish. Based on the population from Sindh described by Hume in 1873; sometimes incorrectly treated as "C. c. subcorax", but the type specimen of Corvus subcorax collected by Nikolai Severtzov is a brown-necked raven. The population in the Sindh district of Pakistan and the adjoining regions of northwestern India is sometimes known as the Punjab raven.
Corvus corax tingitanus Irby, 1874	Boutlélis, Algeria	North Africa	The smallest subspecies, with the shortest throat hackles and a distinctly oily plumage gloss. Its bill is short but markedly stout, and the culmen is strongly arched.
Corvus corax canariensis E. J. O. Hartert & O. Kleinschmidt, 1901	Cumbre Vieja, La Palma, Canary Islands	Canary Islands	A small subspecies, similar to C. c. tingitanus but with browner plumage. Its bill is short but markedly stout, and the culmen is strongly arched. Some authors include it in C. c. tingitanus. Birds on Fuerteventura have been described as a separate subspecies C. c. jordansi Niethammer, 1953, but this is not accepted by any of the major authorities.
Corvus corax tibetanus Hodgson, 1849	Khardung La, India	The Himalaya, at high altitudes 2,500–5,000 (–8,000) m (cf. C. c. laurencei below 600 m in this region)	The largest and glossiest subspecies, with the longest throat hackles. Its bill is large, but less imposing than that of C. c. principalis; the bases of its neck feathers are grey.
Corvus corax kamtschaticus Dybowski, 1883	Kamchatka, Russia	Northeastern Asia	Intergrades into the nominate subspecies in the Lake Baikal region. It is intermediate in size between C. c. principalis and C. c. corax and has a distinctly larger and thicker bill than the nominate subspecies does.

=== Evolutionary history ===
The closest relatives of the common raven are the brown-necked raven (C. ruficollis), the pied crow (C. albus) of Africa, and the Chihuahuan raven (C. cryptoleucus) of the North American Southwest.

The common raven evolved in the Old World and crossed the Bering land bridge into North America. Recent genetic studies, which examined the DNA of common ravens from across the world, have determined that the birds fall into at least two clades: a California clade (subspecies C. c. clarionensis), found only in the southwestern United States, and a Holarctic clade, found across the rest of the Northern Hemisphere. Birds from both clades look alike, but the groups are genetically distinct and began to diverge about two million years ago.

The findings indicate that based on mitochondrial DNA, common ravens from the rest of North America are more closely related to those in Europe and Asia, than to those in the California clade, and that common ravens in the California clade are more closely related to the Chihuahuan raven (C. cryptoleucus) than to those in the Holarctic clade. Ravens in the Holarctic clade are more closely related to the pied crow (C. albus) than they are to the California clade. Thus, the common raven species as traditionally delimited is considered to be paraphyletic.

One explanation for these genetic findings is that common ravens settled in California at least two million years ago and became separated from their relatives in Europe and Asia during a glacial period. One million years ago, a group from the California clade evolved into a new species, the Chihuahuan raven. Other members of the Holarctic clade arrived later in a separate migration from Asia, perhaps at the same time as humans and wolves about 15,000 years ago.

A 2011 study suggested that there are no restrictions on gene flow between the Californian and Holarctic common raven groups, and that the lineages can remerge, effectively reversing a potential speciation.

A 2006 study of raven mitochondrial DNA showed that the isolated population from the Canary Islands is distinct from other populations. The study did not include any individuals from the North African population, and its position is therefore unclear, though its morphology is very close to the population of the Canaries (to the extent that the two are often considered part of a single subspecies).

== Description ==
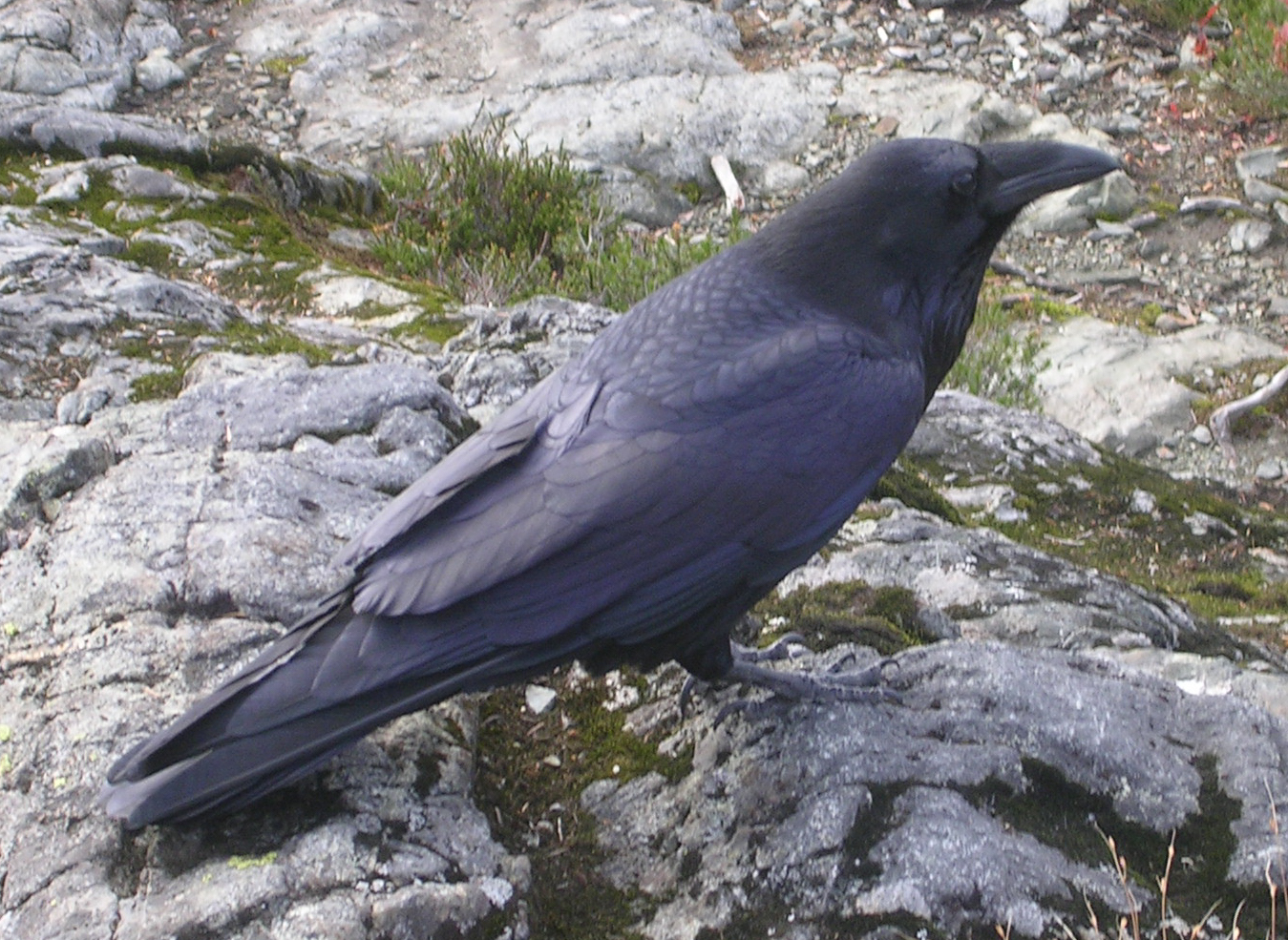
In sunlight, the plumage can display a blue or purple sheen which is a result of iridescence.

A mature common raven ranges between 54 and 71 cm (21 and 28 in) and has a wingspan of 116 to 153 cm (46 to 60 in). Recorded weights range from 0.69 to 2.250 kg (1.52 to 4.96 lb), thus making the common raven one of the heaviest passerines. Birds from colder regions such as the Himalayas and Greenland are generally larger with slightly larger bills, while those from warmer regions are smaller with proportionally smaller bills. Representative of the size variation in the species, ravens from California weighed an average of 0.784 kg (1.73 lb), those from Alaska weighed an average of 1.135 kg (2.50 lb) and those from Nova Scotia weighed an average of 1.230 kg (2.71 lb). The bill is large and slightly curved, with a culmen length of 5.7 to 8.5 cm (2.2 to 3.3 in), one of the largest bills amongst passerines (only the thick-billed raven and white-necked raven have larger bills). It has a longish, strongly graduated tail, at 20 to 26.3 cm (7.9 to 10.4 in), and mostly iridescent black plumage, and a dark brown iris. The throat feathers are elongated and pointed and the bases of the neck feathers are pale brownish-grey. The legs and feet are stout and strong, with a tarsus length of 6 to 7.2 cm (2.4 to 2.8 in). The juvenile plumage is similar but duller, with a blue-grey iris, and pinkish gape at first.

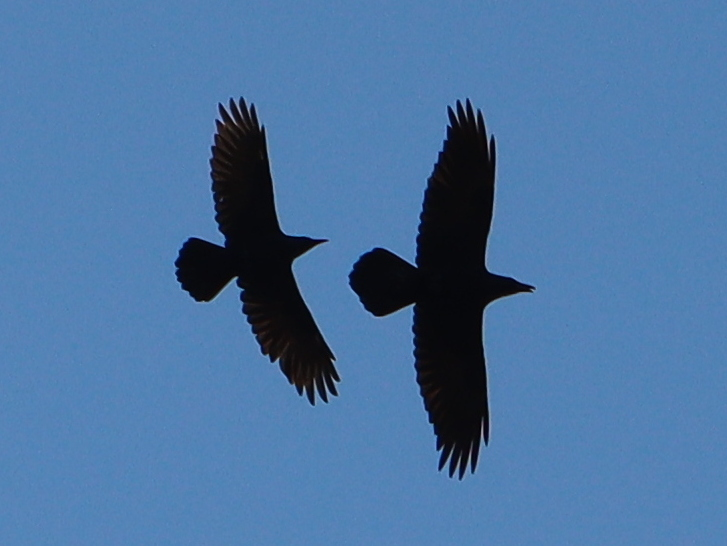
Comparison between an American crow (left) and a common raven (right)

Apart from its greater size, the common raven differs from related crows by having a larger and heavier black beak, shaggy feathers around the throat, longer bristles above the beak, and a longer, wedge-shaped tail. Flying ravens are distinguished from crows by their tail shape, larger wing area, and more stable soaring style, which generally involves less wing flapping. Despite their bulk, ravens are easily as agile in flight as their smaller cousins. In flight the feathers produce a creaking sound that has been likened to the rustle of silk. The voice of ravens is also quite distinct, its usual call being a deep croak of a much more sonorous quality than a crow's call, though the calls of other ravens like the fan-tailed raven and brown-necked raven can be confused where they occur together with common ravens in parts of southwest Asia and northern Africa; of these two, the fan-tailed raven is more similar in calls but has a very different shape with its broad wings and very short tail, while the brown-necked raven can be very hard to distinguish on plumage, but has somewhat more crow-like calls. In North America, the Chihuahuan raven (C. cryptoleucus) is fairly similar to the relatively small common ravens of the American southwest and is best distinguished by the still relatively smaller size of its bill, beard and body and relatively longer tail. The all-black carrion crow (C. corone) and rook (C. frugilegus) in Europe may suggest a raven due to their largish bill but are still distinctly smaller and have the wing and tail shapes typical of crows.

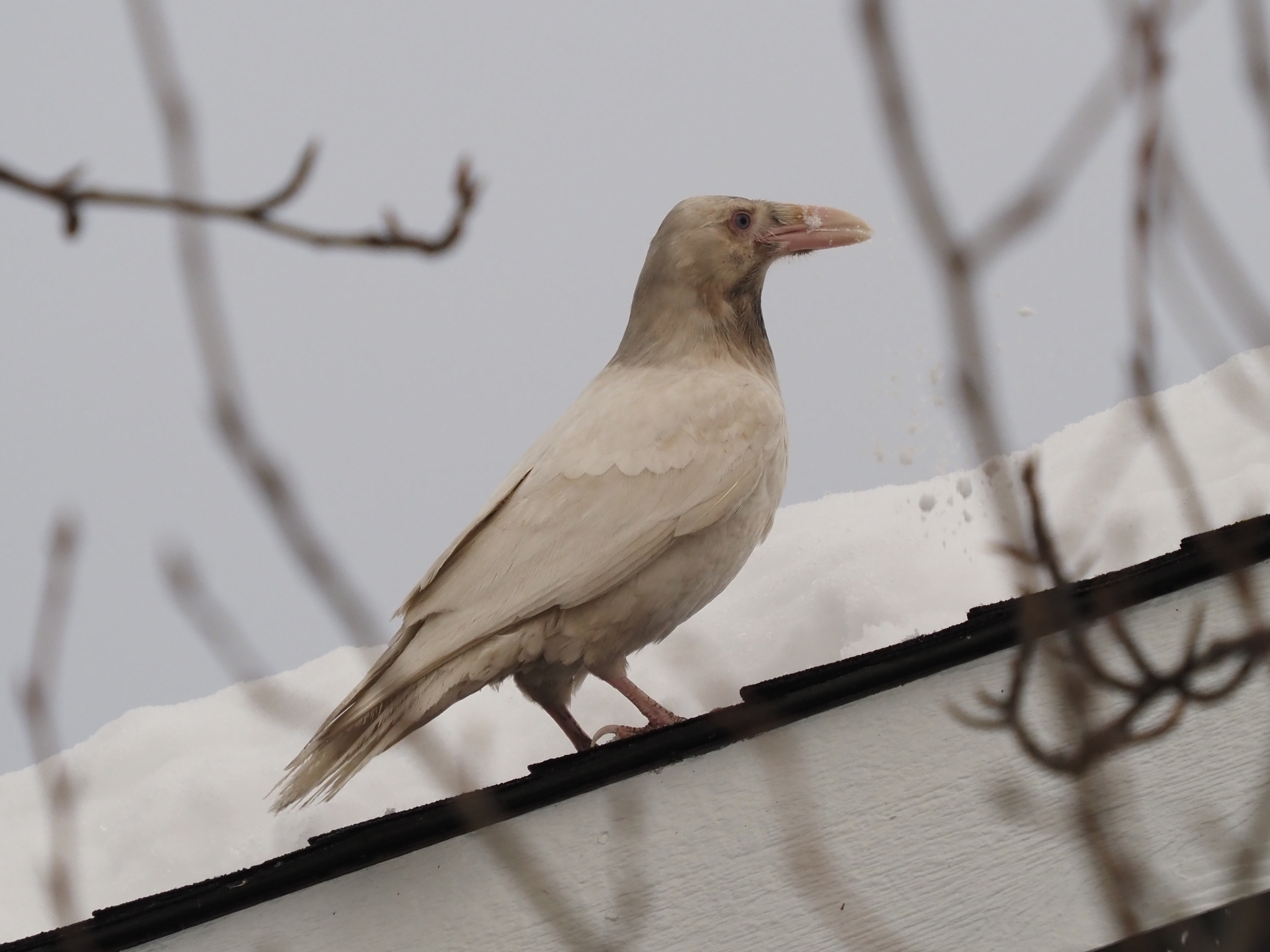
Leucistic. This individual is locally well known in Anchorage (Alaska).

In the Faroe Islands, a now-extinct pied colour morph of this species existed, known as the pied raven; the ordinary black-coloured common ravens remain widespread in the archipelago. White ravens are occasionally found in the wild. Some in British Columbia lacked the pink eyes of an albino, and were instead leucistic, a condition where an animal lacks any of several different types of pigment, not simply melanin.

Vocalising

Common ravens have a wide range of vocalizations which are of interest to ornithologists. Gwinner carried out important studies in the early 1960s, recording and photographing his findings in great detail. Fifteen to thirty categories of calls have been recorded for this species, most of which are used for social interaction. Calls recorded include alarm calls, chase calls, and flight calls. The species has a distinctive, deep, resonant prruk-prruk-prruk call, which to experienced listeners is unlike that of any other corvid. Its very wide and complex vocabulary includes a high, knocking toc-toc-toc, a dry, grating kraa, a low guttural rattle and some calls of an almost musical nature.

Like other corvids, the common raven can mimic sounds from their environment, including human speech. Non-vocal sounds produced by the common raven include wing whistles and bill snapping. Clapping or clicking has been observed more often in females than in males. If a member of a pair is lost, its mate reproduces the calls of its lost partner to encourage its return.

== Distribution and habitat ==
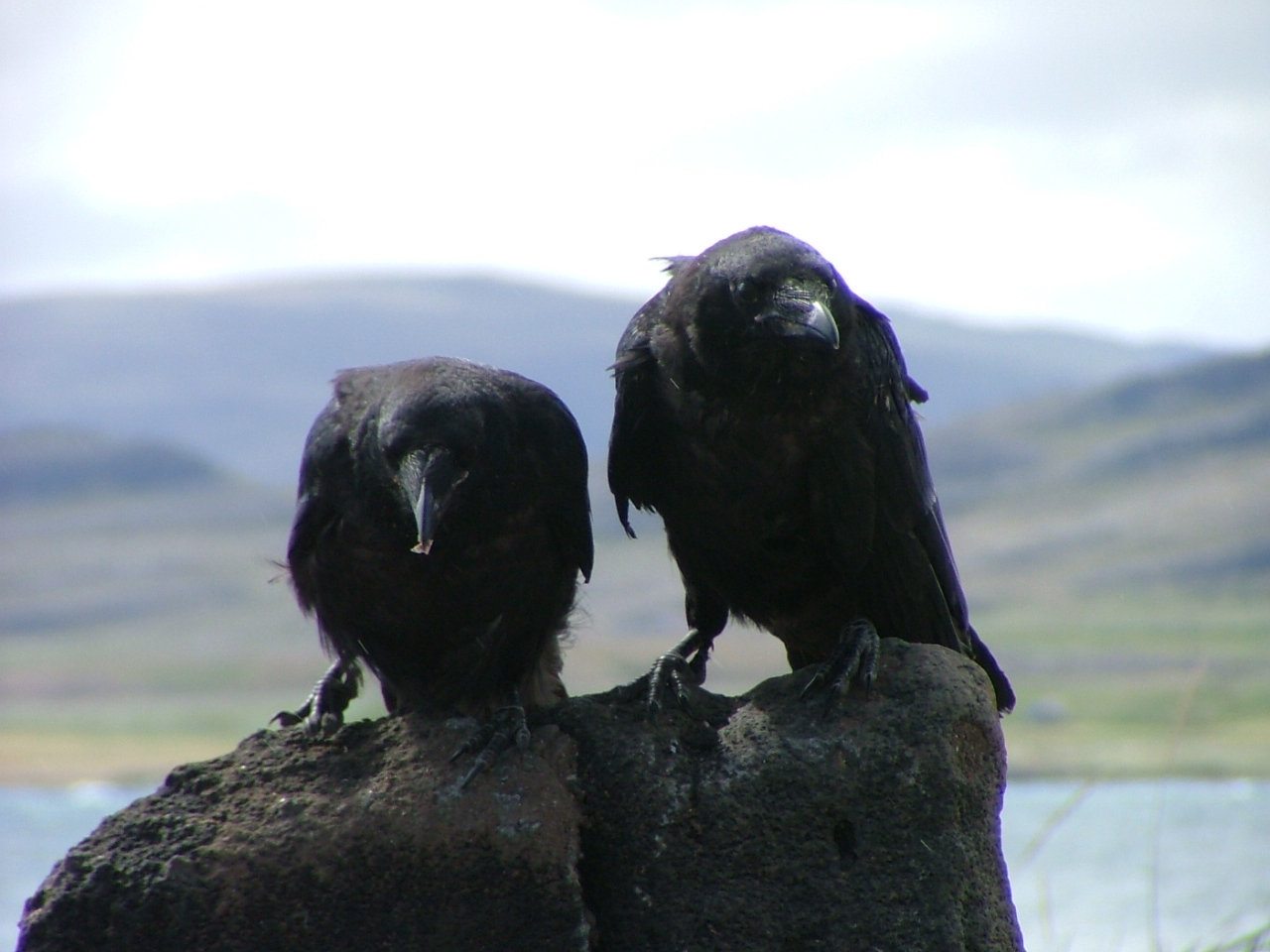
Two juveniles in Iceland

The common raven can thrive in varied climates; it has the largest range of any member of the genus, and one of the largest of any passerine. They range throughout the Holarctic from Arctic and temperate habitats in North America and Eurasia to the deserts of North Africa, and to islands in the Pacific Ocean. In the British Isles, they are more common in Scotland, Wales, western England and Ireland, having been eradicated from other areas by gamekeeping interests. In Tibet, they have been recorded at altitudes up to 5,000 m (16,400 ft), and as high as 6,350 m (20,600 ft) on Mount Everest. The population sometimes known as the 'Punjab raven', part of the subspecies Corvus corax laurencei (sometimes misnamed C. c. subcorax) occurs in the Sindh district of Pakistan and adjoining regions of northwestern India. They are generally resident within their range for the whole year. In his 1950 work, Grønlands Fugle [Birds of Greenland], noted ornithologist Finn Salomonsen indicated that common ravens did not overwinter in the Arctic. However, in Arctic Canada and Alaska, they are found year-round. Young birds may disperse locally.

In the United Kingdom, the range is currently increasing after improved legal protection, but illegal persecution by gamekeepers remains a problem in many areas. It favours mountainous or coastal terrain, but can also be found in parks with tall trees suitable for use as habitation. Its population is at its most dense in the north and west of the country, though the species is expanding its population southwards.

Most common ravens prefer wooded areas with large expanses of open land nearby, or coastal regions for their nesting sites and feeding grounds. In some areas of dense human population, such as California in the United States, they take advantage of a plentiful food supply and have seen a surge in their numbers. On coasts, individuals of this species are often evenly distributed and prefer to build their nest sites along sea cliffs. Common ravens are often located in coastal regions because these areas provide easy access to water and a variety of food sources. Also, coastal regions have stable weather patterns without extreme cold or hot temperatures.

In general, common ravens live in a wide array of environments but prefer heavily contoured landscapes. When the environment changes in vast degrees, these birds will respond with a stress response. The hormone known as corticosterone is activated by the hypothalamic–pituitary–adrenal axis. Corticosterone is activated when the bird is exposed to stress, such as migrating great distances.

== Behaviour ==
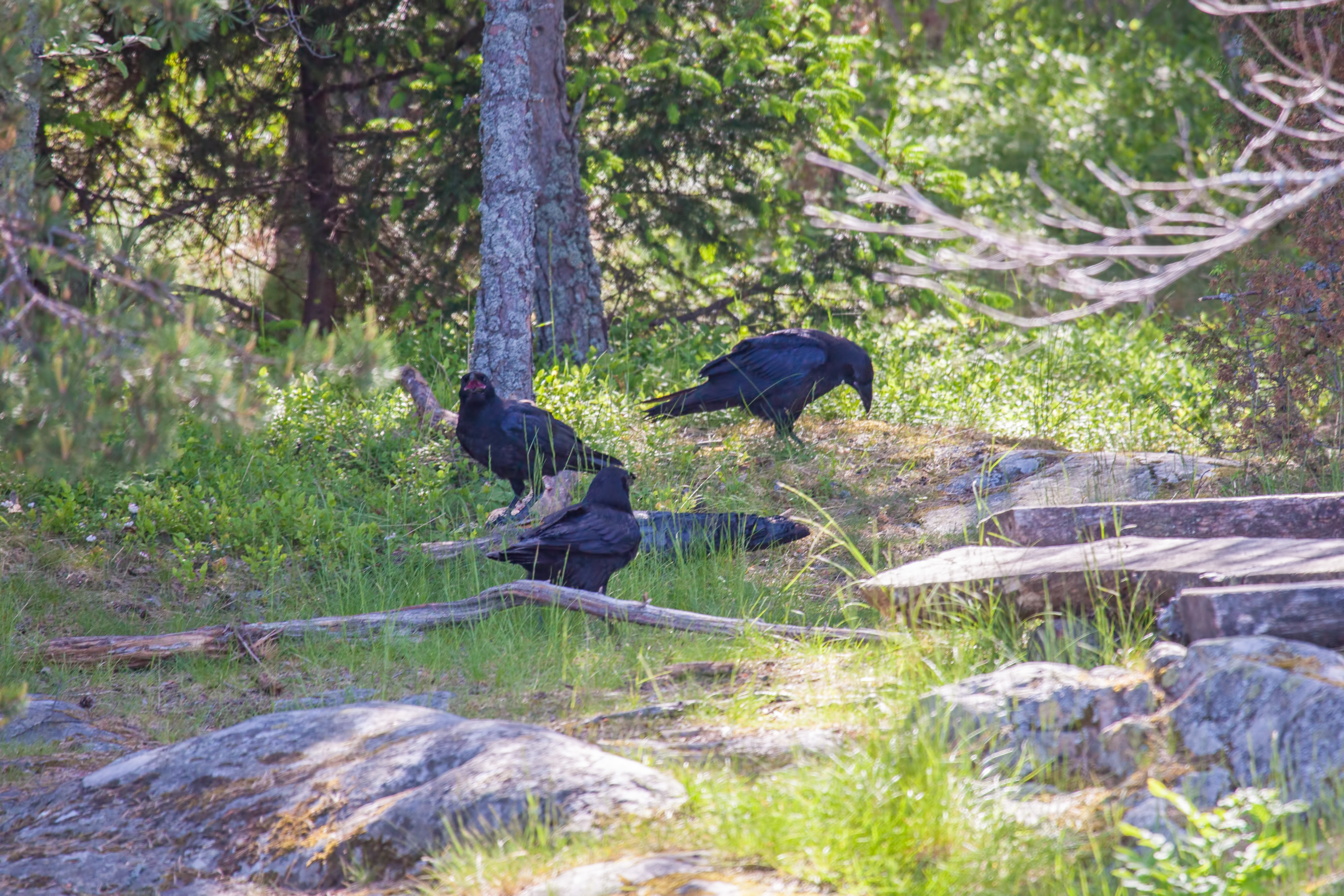
Group of ravens gathered around dead member

Common ravens usually travel in mated pairs, although young birds may form flocks. Relationships between common ravens are often quarrelsome, yet they demonstrate considerable devotion to their families.

=== Predation ===
Owing to its size, gregariousness and its defensive abilities, the common raven has few natural predators. Predators of its eggs and chicks include martens, large owls, and sometimes eagles. Ravens are quite vigorous at defending their young and are usually successful at driving off perceived threats. They attack potential predators by flying at them and lunging with their large bills. Humans are occasionally attacked if they get close to a raven nest, though serious injuries are unlikely. There are a few records of large birds of prey taking ravens; more rarely, large mammalian predators such as lynxes, coyotes and cougars have also attacked ravens. This principally occurs at a nest site and when other prey for the carnivores are scarce.

In North America, predators of ravens have reportedly included great horned owls, American goshawks, bald eagles, golden eagles and red-tailed hawks. It is possible that the hawk species only attack young ravens; in one instance a peregrine falcon swooped at a newly fledged raven but was chased off by the parent ravens. Ravens are wary around novel carrion sites, and in North America, have been recorded waiting for the presence of American crows and blue jays before approaching to eat.

In Eurasia, their reported predators include, in addition to golden eagles, Eurasian eagle-owls, white-tailed eagles, Steller's sea-eagles, eastern imperial eagles and gyrfalcons. Because they are potentially hazardous prey for raptorial birds, raptors must usually take them by surprise and most attacks are on fledgling ravens.

=== Breeding ===
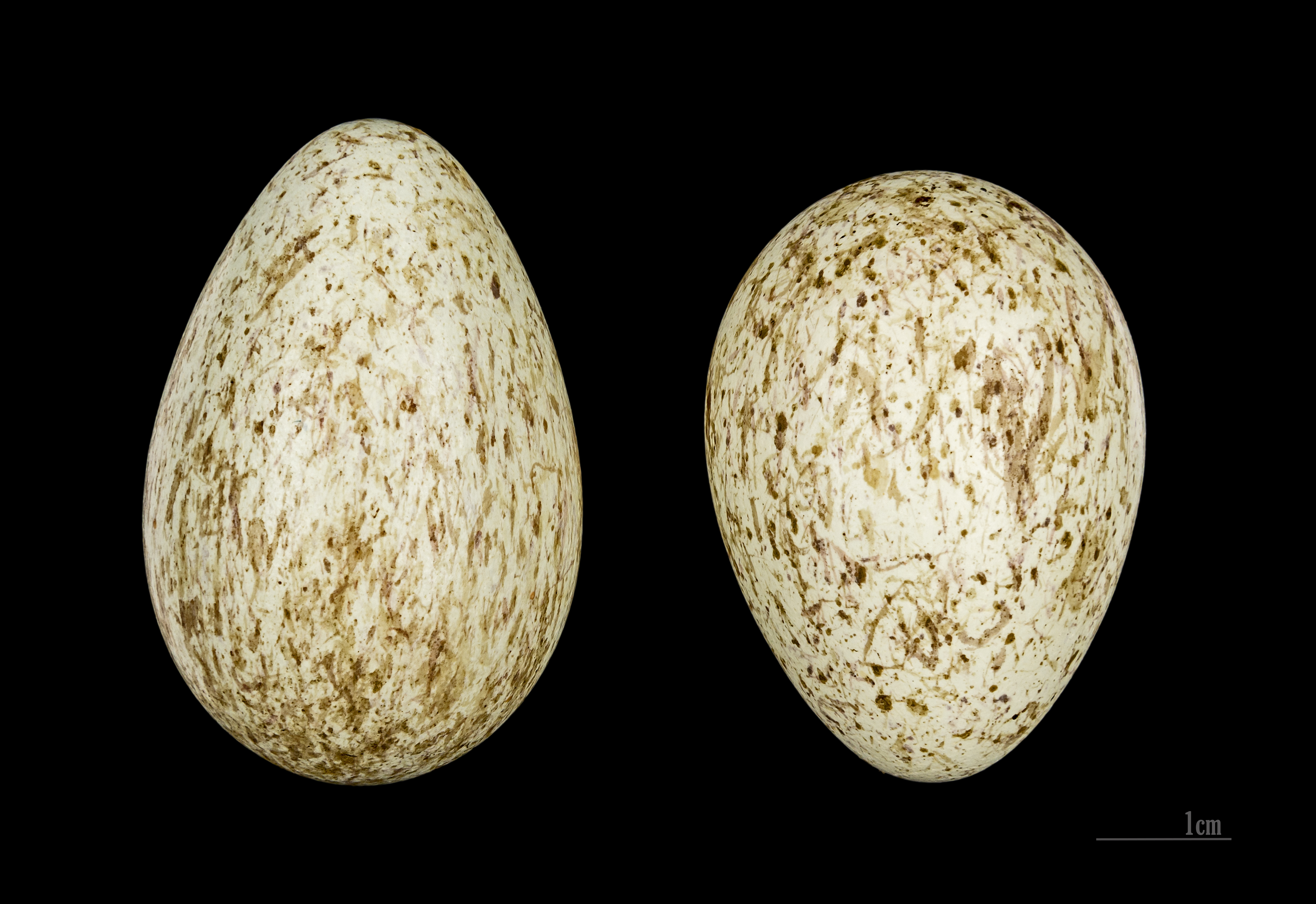
Eggs of Corvus corax

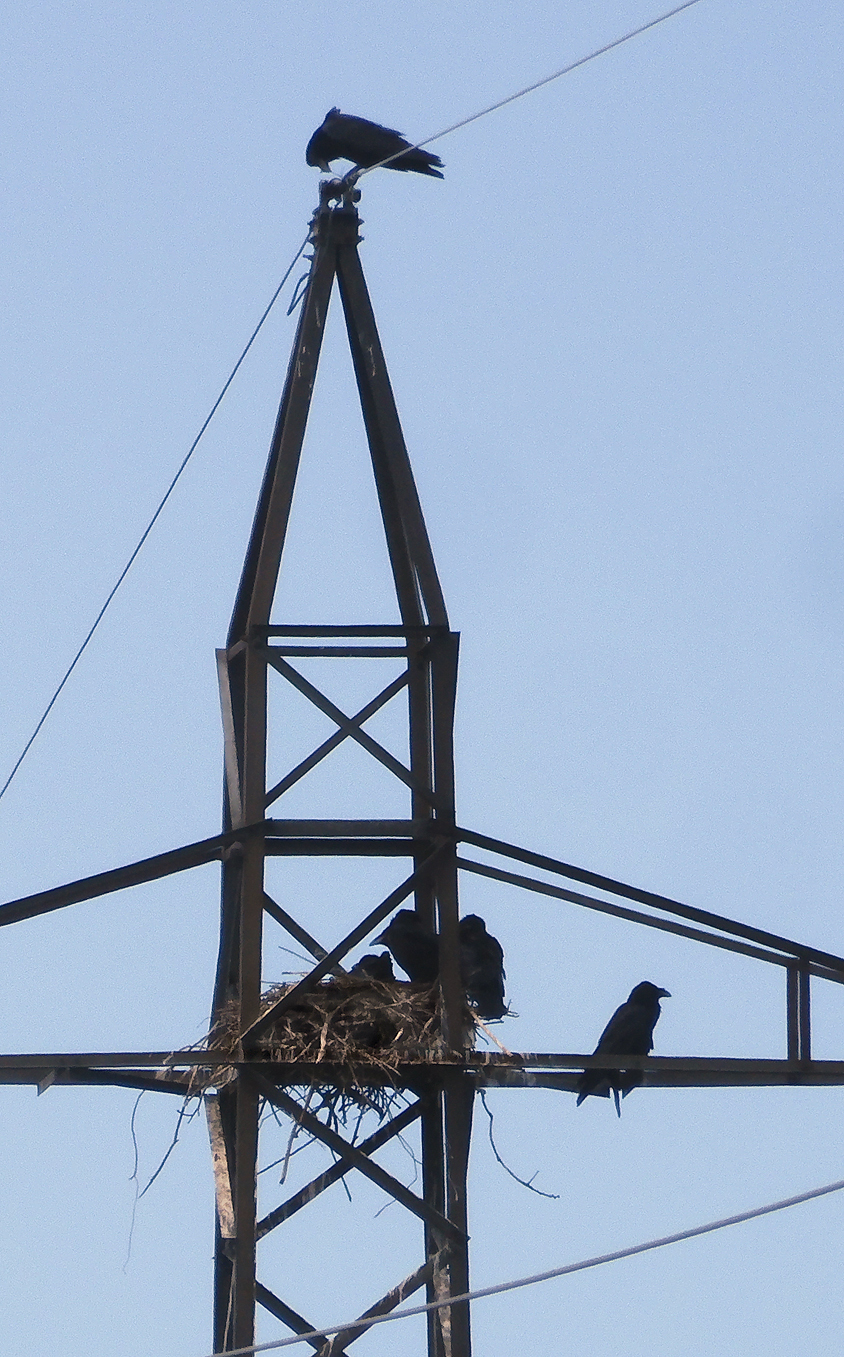
A pair with 3–4 young on top of a high-voltage pylon in Ystad

Juveniles begin to court at a very early age, but may not bond for another two or three years. Aerial acrobatics and ability to provide food are key behaviours of courting. Once paired, they tend to nest together for life, usually in the same location. Instances of non-monogamy have been observed in common ravens, by males visiting a female's nest when her mate is away.

Breeding pairs must have a territory of their own before they begin nest-building and reproduction, and thus they aggressively defend a territory and its food resources. Nesting territories vary in size according to the density of food resources in the area. The nest is a deep bowl made of large sticks (up to 150 cm long and 2.5 cm thick) and twigs, bound with an inner layer of roots, mud, and bark and lined with a softer material, such as deer fur. The nest is usually placed in a large tree or on a cliff ledge, or less frequently in old buildings or utility poles.

Females usually lay four to six (rarely two to seven) pale bluish-green, brown-blotched eggs. Incubation is about 18 to 21 days, by the female only. The male may stand or crouch over the young, sheltering but not actually brooding them. The young fledge at 35 to 49 days, and are fed by both parents. They stay with their parents for another six months after fledging.

In most of their range, egg-laying begins in late January or February, but it can be as late as April in colder climates such as Greenland and Tibet. In Pakistan, egg-laying takes place in December, but in north Africa (subspecies C. c. tingitanus), later than in Europe, in late March or early April. Eggs and hatchlings are preyed on, rarely, by large hawks and eagles, large owls, martens and canids. The adults, which are very rarely preyed upon, are often successful in defending their young from these predators, due to their numbers, large size and cunning. They have been observed dropping stones on potential predators that venture close to their nests.

Common ravens can be very long-lived, especially in captive or protected conditions; individuals at the Tower of London have lived for more than 40 years. Their lifespans in the wild are shorter, typically 10 to 15 years. The longest known lifespan of a ringed wild common raven was 23 years, 3 months, which among passerines only is surpassed by a few Australian species such as the satin bowerbird.

=== Feeding ===
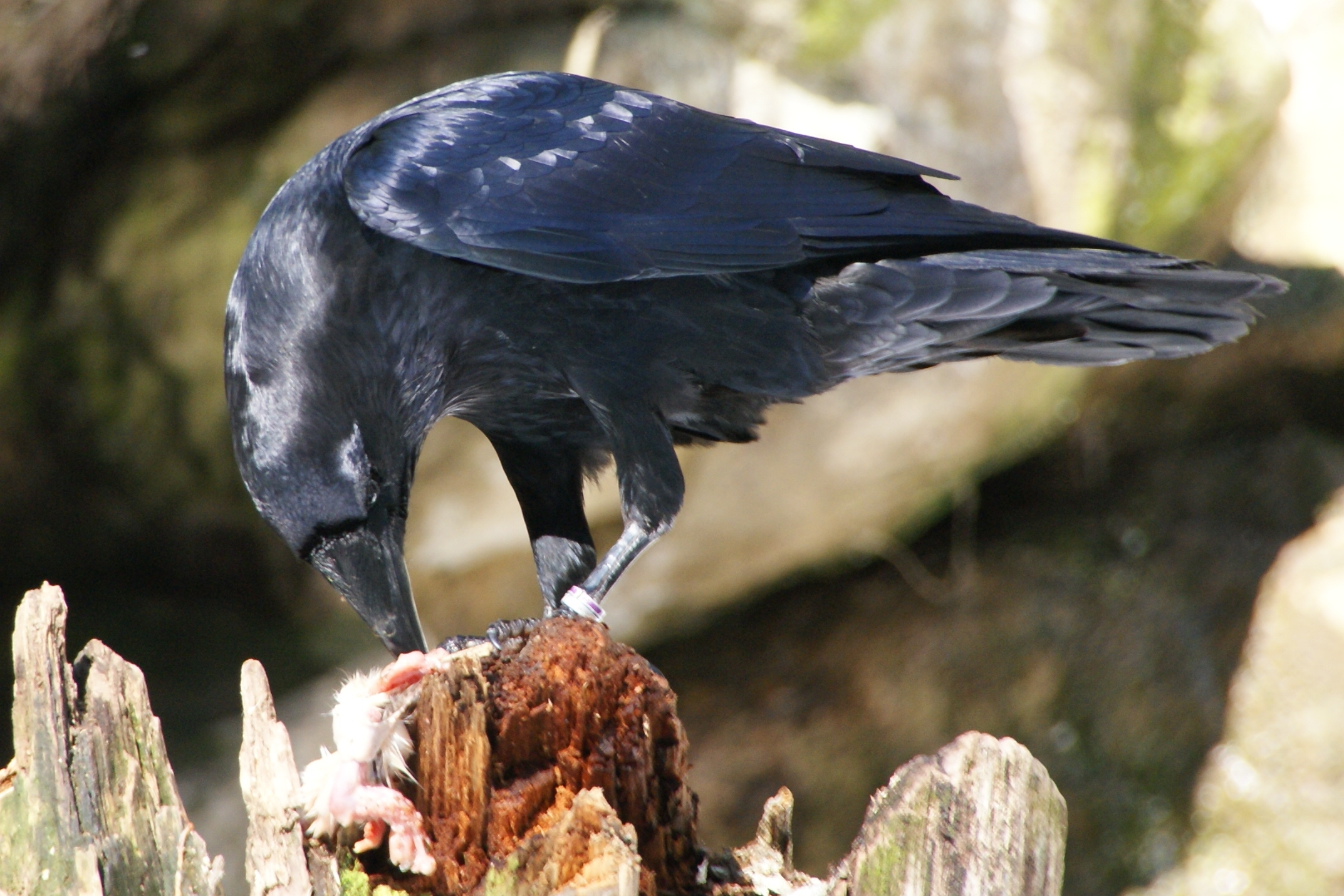
Feeding

Common ravens are omnivorous and highly opportunistic: their diet may vary widely with location, season and serendipity. For example, those foraging on tundra on the Arctic North Slope of Alaska obtained about half their energy needs from predation, mainly of microtine rodents, and half by scavenging, mainly of caribou and ptarmigan carcasses.

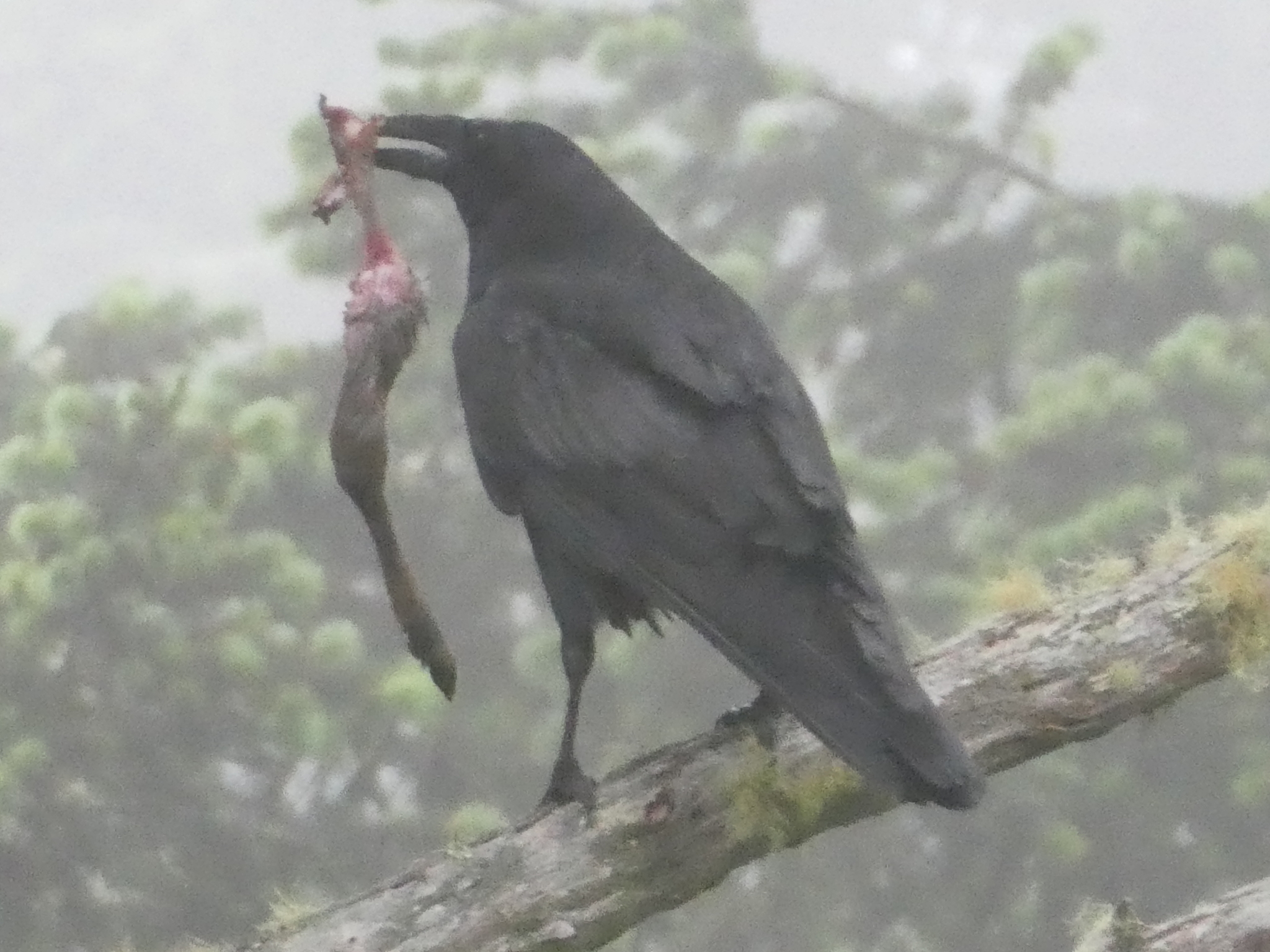
Holding a deer leg

In some places they are mainly scavengers, feeding on carrion as well as the associated maggots and carrion beetles. With large-bodied carrion, which they are not equipped to tear through as well as birds such as the much larger and hook-billed vultures, they must wait for the prey to be torn open by another predator or flayed by other means. They are also known to eat the afterbirth of ewes and other large mammals. Plant food includes cereal grains, acorns, buds, berries and fruit. They prey on small invertebrates, amphibians, reptiles, small mammals and birds. Ravens may also consume the undigested portions of animal faeces, and human food waste. They store surplus food items, especially those containing fat, and will learn to hide such food out of the sight of other common ravens. Ravens also raid the food caches of other species, such as the Arctic fox. They often associate with another canine, the wolf, as a kleptoparasite, following to scavenge wolf-kills in winter, but also co-operatively, having been observed to lead hunting wolf packs to potential prey that only the ravens can see from the air. Ravens are regular predators at bird nests, brazenly picking off eggs, nestlings and sometimes adult birds when they spot an opportunity. They are considered perhaps the primary natural threat to the nesting success of the critically endangered California condor, since they readily take condor eggs and are very common in the areas where the species is being re-introduced. On the other hand, when they defend their own adjacent nests, they may incidentally benefit condors since they chase golden eagles out of the area that may otherwise prey upon larger nestling and fledging condors. Although condors recognise ravens as threats and will chase them away, their usual nest sites are poorly concealed from ravens; the reason is unknown, but it may be due to the condor's lower aerial manoeuvrability, or a holdover from times when condor populations were denser, nest sites more limiting, and ravens less abundant.

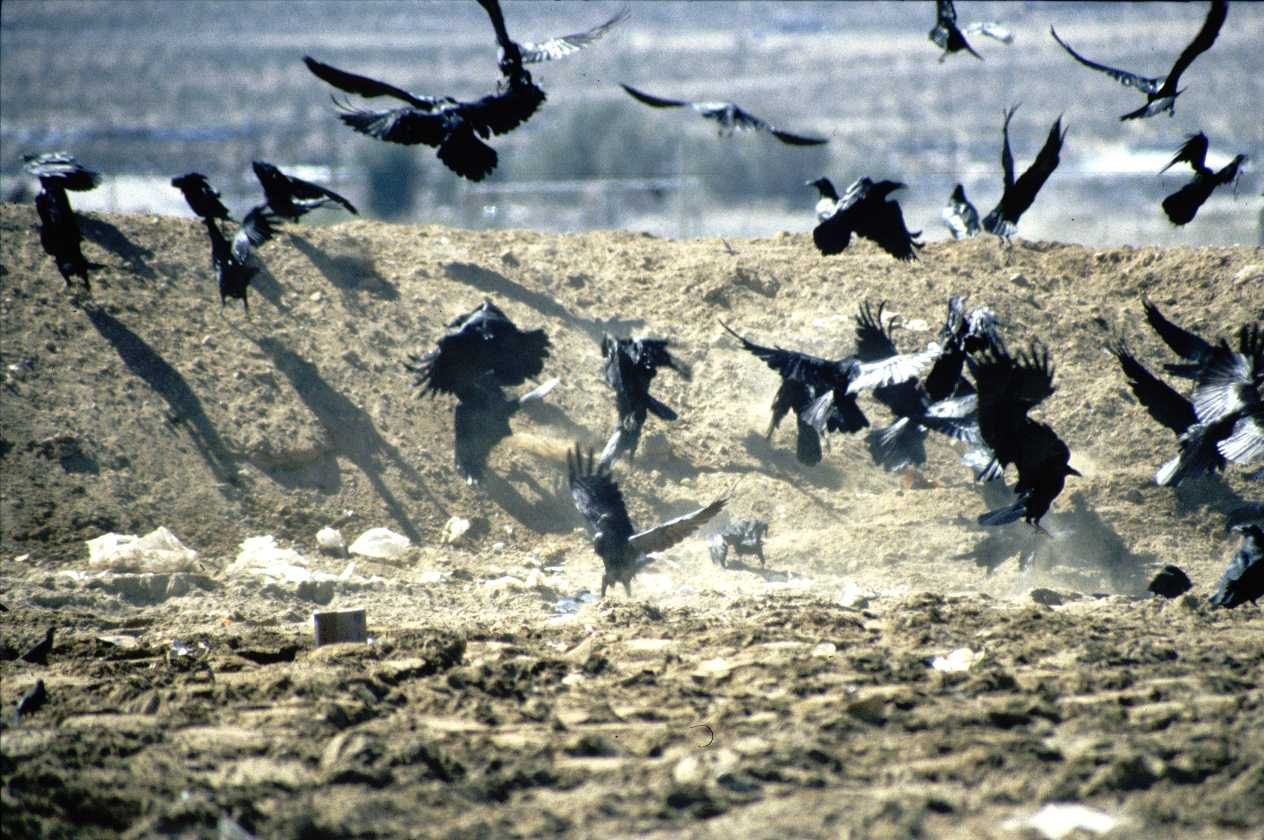
Flock feeding at a garbage dump

Common ravens nesting near sources of human garbage included a higher percentage of food waste in their diet, birds nesting near roads consumed more road-killed vertebrates, and those nesting far from these sources of food ate more arthropods and plant material. Fledging success was higher for those using human garbage as a food source. In contrast, a 1984–1986 study of common raven diet in an agricultural region of southwestern Idaho found that cereal grains were the principal constituent of pellets, though small mammals, grasshoppers, cattle carrion and birds were also eaten.

One behaviour is recruitment, where juvenile ravens call other ravens to a food bonanza, usually a carcass, with a series of loud yells. In Ravens in Winter, Bernd Heinrich posited that this behaviour evolved to allow the juveniles to outnumber the resident adults, thus allowing them to feed on the carcass without being chased away. A more mundane explanation is that individuals co-operate in sharing information about carcasses of large mammals because they are too big for just a few birds to exploit. Experiments with baits however show that such recruitment behaviour is independent of the size of the bait.

Furthermore, there has been research suggesting that the common raven is involved in seed dispersal. In the wild, the common raven chooses the best habitat and disperses seeds in locations best suited for its survival.

=== Intelligence ===
The brain of the common raven is among the largest of any bird species. Specifically, their hyperpallium is large for a bird. They display ability in problem-solving, as well as other cognitive processes such as imitation and insight.

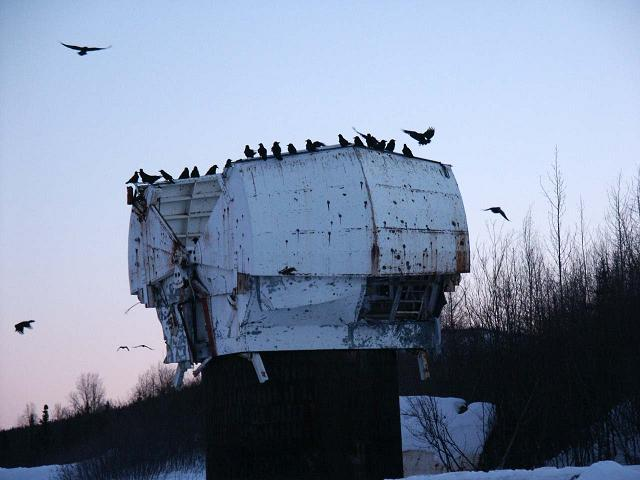
Dilapidated Nike Missile radar dome in Alaska with an evening roost

Linguist Derek Bickerton, building on the work of biologist Bernd Heinrich, has argued that ravens are one of only four known animals (the others being bees, ants, and humans) who have demonstrated displacement, the capacity to communicate about objects or events that are distant in space or time. Subadult ravens roost together at night, but usually forage alone during the day. However, when one discovers a large carcass guarded by a pair of adult ravens, the unmated raven will return to the roost and communicate the find. The following day, a flock of unmated ravens will fly to the carcass and chase off the adults. Bickerton argues that the advent of linguistic displacement was perhaps the most important event in the evolution of human language, and that ravens are the only other vertebrate to share this with humans.

One experiment designed to evaluate insight and problem-solving ability involved a piece of meat attached to a string hanging from a perch. To reach the food, the bird needed to stand on the perch, pull the string up a little at a time, and step on the loops to gradually shorten the string. Four of five common ravens eventually succeeded, and "the transition from no success (ignoring the food or merely yanking at the string) to constant reliable access (pulling up the meat) occurred with no demonstrable trial-and-error learning." This supports the hypothesis that common ravens are 'inventors', implying that they can solve problems. Many of the feats of common ravens were formerly argued to be stereotyped innate behaviour, but it now has been established that their aptitudes for solving problems individually and learning from each other reflect a flexible capacity for intelligent insight unusual among non-human animals. Another experiment showed that some common ravens could intentionally deceive their conspecifics.

A study published in 2011 found that ravens can recognise when they are given an unfair trade during reciprocal interactions with conspecifics or humans, retaining memory of the interaction for a prolonged period of time. Birds that were given a fair trade by experimenters were found to prefer interacting with these experimenters compared to those that did not. Furthermore, ravens in the wild have also been observed to stop cooperating with other ravens if they observe them cheating during group tasks.

Common ravens have been observed calling wolves to the site of dead animals. The wolves open the carcass, leaving the scraps more accessible to the birds. They watch where other common ravens bury their food and remember the locations of each other's food caches, so they can steal from them. This type of theft occurs so regularly that common ravens will fly extra distances from a food source to find better hiding places for food. They have also been observed pretending to make a cache without actually depositing the food, presumably to confuse onlookers.

Common ravens are known to steal and cache shiny objects, such as pebbles, pieces of metal, and golf balls. One theory is that they hoard shiny objects to impress other ravens. Other research indicates that juveniles are deeply curious about all new things, and that common ravens retain an attraction to bright, round objects based on their similarity to bird eggs. Mature birds lose their intense interest in the unusual, and become highly neophobic.

The first large-scale assessment of ravens' cognitive abilities suggests that, by four months of age, ravens do about as well as adult chimpanzees and orangutans on tests of causal reasoning, social learning, theory of mind, etc.

=== Play ===
There has been increasing recognition of the extent to which birds engage in play. Juvenile common ravens are among the most playful of bird species. They have been observed to slide down snowbanks, apparently purely for fun. They even engage in games with other species, such as playing catch-me-if-you-can with wolves, otters and dogs.

Common ravens are known for spectacular aerobatic displays, such as flying in loops or interlocking talons with each other in flight. And often, ravens can be seen soaring over hilly or mountainous terrain, taking advantage of ridge lift.

They are also one of only a few wild animals who make their own toys. They have been observed breaking off twigs to play with socially.

== Relationship with humans ==
=== Conservation and management ===
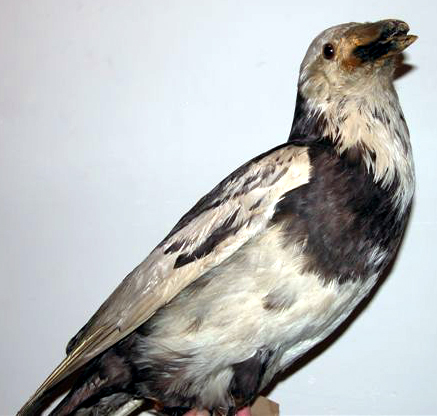
Specimen of the extinct pied raven, a colour morph from the Faroe Islands

Compared to many smaller Corvus species (such as carrion crow and American crow), ravens prefer undisturbed mountain or forest habitat or rural areas over urban areas. In other areas, their numbers have increased dramatically and they have become agricultural pests. Common ravens can cause damage to crops, such as nuts and grain, or can harm livestock, particularly by killing young goat kids, lambs and calves. Ravens generally attack the faces of young livestock, but the more common raven behaviour of scavenging may be misidentified as predation by ranchers.

In the western Mojave Desert, human settlement and land development have led to an estimated 16-fold increase in the common raven population over 25 years. Towns, landfills, sewage treatment plants and artificial ponds create sources of food and water for scavenging birds. Ravens also find nesting sites in utility poles and ornamental trees, and are attracted to roadkill on highways. The explosion in the common raven population in the Mojave has raised concerns for the desert tortoise, a threatened species. Common ravens prey upon juvenile tortoises, which have soft shells and move slowly. Plans to control the population have included shooting and trapping birds, as well as contacting landfill operators to ask that they reduce the amount of exposed garbage. A hunting bounty as a method of control was historically used in Finland from the mid-18th century until 1923. Culling has taken place to a limited extent in Alaska, where the population increase in common ravens is threatening the vulnerable Steller's eider (Polysticta stelleri).

Ravens, like other corvids, are definitive hosts of West Nile virus (WNV). The transmission can be from infected birds to humans via Culex mosquito vectors, and ravens are susceptible to WNV. However, in a 2010 study, it was shown that the California Common Ravens did not have a high positivity rate of WNV.

=== Cultural depictions ===
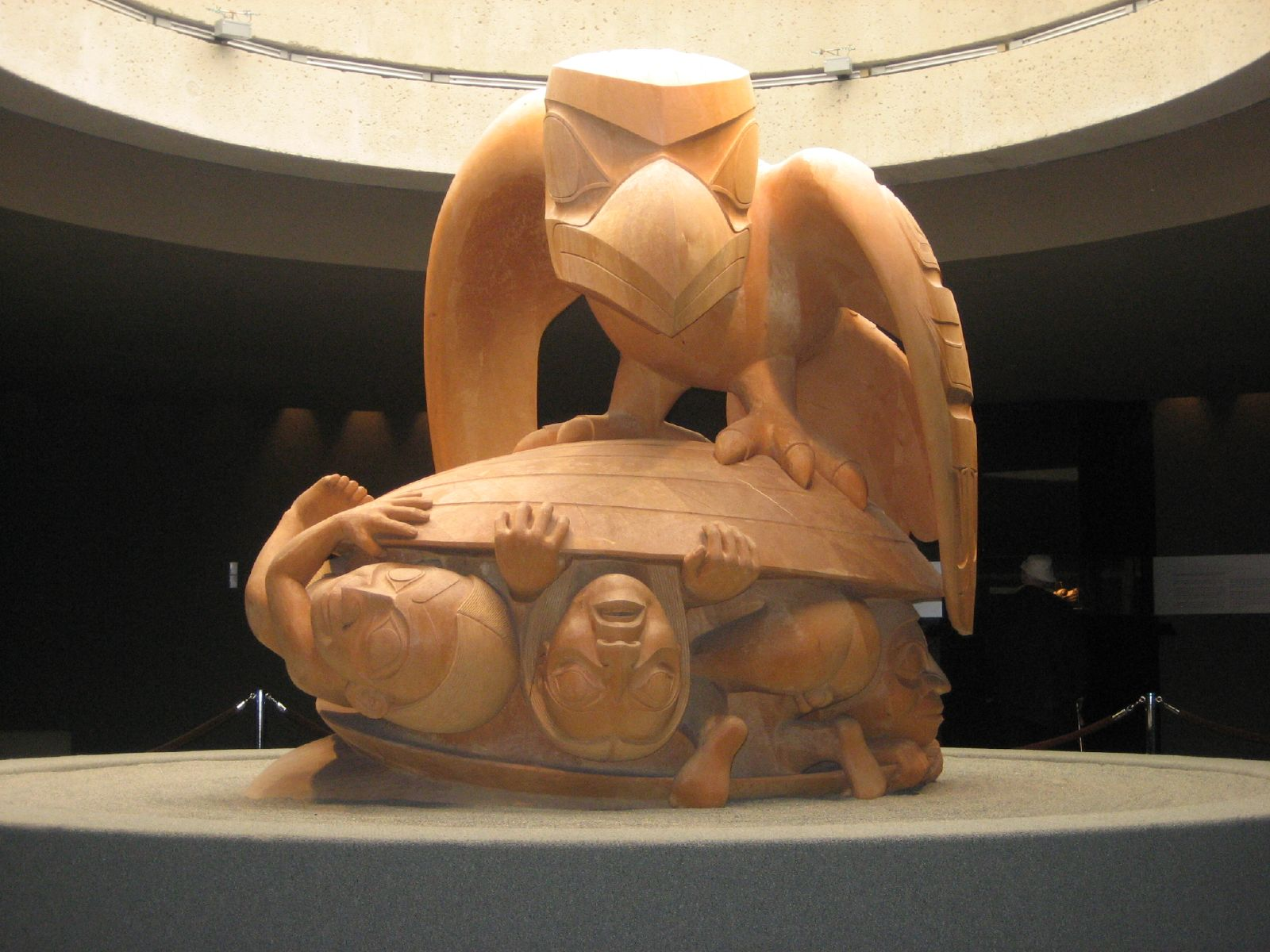
Bill Reid's sculpture The Raven and the First Men, showing part of a Haida creation myth. Museum of Anthropology, University of British Columbia.

Across its range in the Northern Hemisphere, and throughout human history, the common raven has been a powerful symbol and a popular subject of mythology and folklore.

In some Western traditions, ravens have long been considered to be birds of ill omen, death and evil in general, in part because of the negative symbolism of their all-black plumage and the eating of carrion. In Sweden, ravens are known as the ghosts of murdered people, and in Germany as the souls of the damned. In Danish folklore, valravne that ate a king's heart gained human knowledge, could perform great malicious acts, could lead people astray, had superhuman powers, and were "terrible animals".

It continues to be used as a symbol in areas where it once had mythological status: as the national bird of Bhutan (kings of Bhutan wear the Raven Crown), official bird of the Yukon territory, and on the coat of arms of the Isle of Man (once a Viking colony).

In Persia and Arabia, the raven was held as a bird of bad omen but a 14th-century Arabic work reports use of the raven in falconry.

The modern unisex given name Raven is derived from the English word "raven". As a masculine name, Raven parallels the Old Norse Hrafn, and Old English *Hræfn, which were both bynames and personal names.

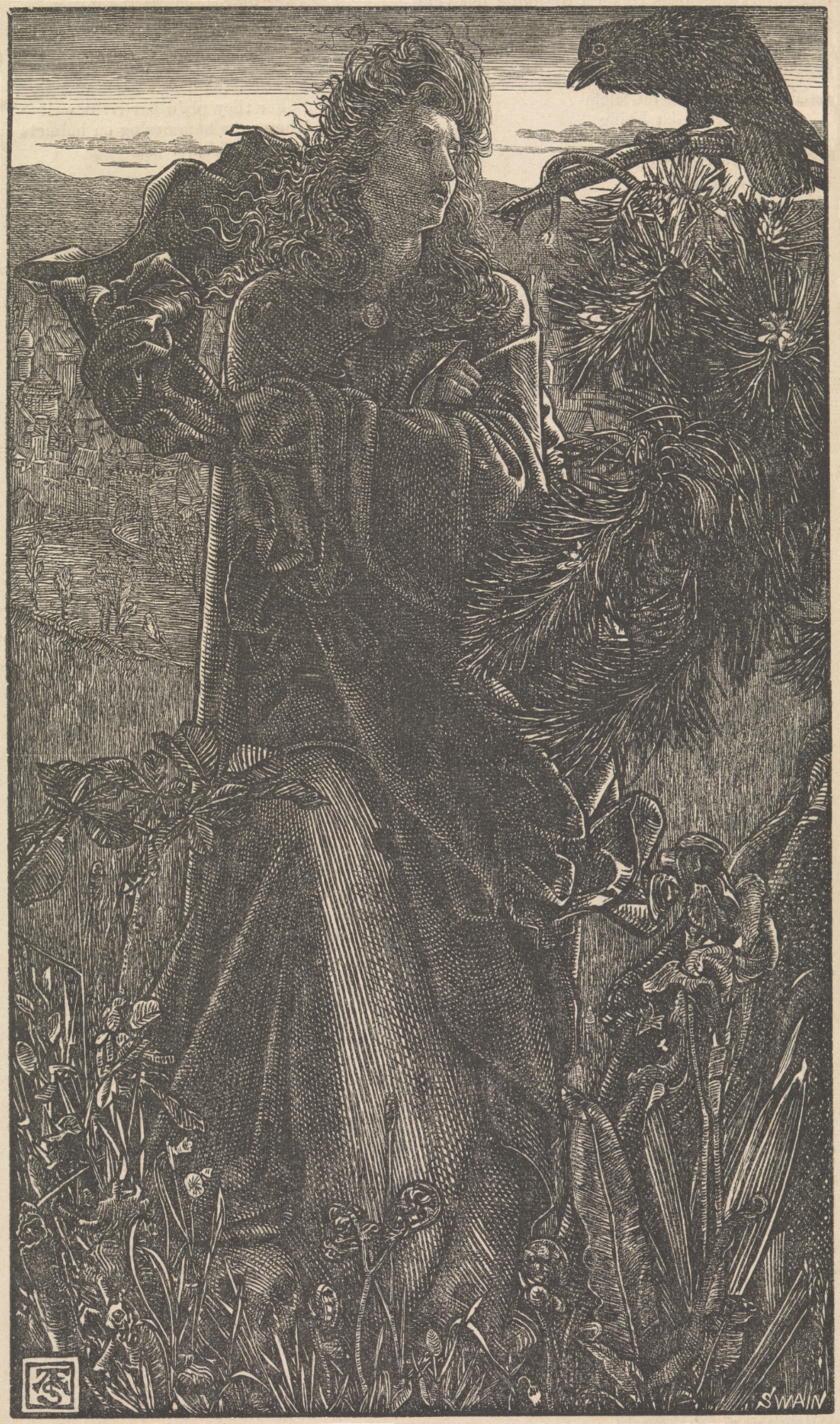
A valkyrie speaks with a raven in a 19th-century illustration of the Old Norse poem Hrafnsmál ("raven song") by Frederick Sandys.

==== Mythology ====
In the Tlingit and Haida cultures, Raven was both a trickster and creator god. Related beliefs are widespread among the peoples of Siberia and northeastern Asia. The Kamchatka Peninsula, for example, was supposed to have been created by the raven god Kutkh. There are several references to common ravens in the Old Testament of the Bible and it is an aspect of Mahakala in Bhutanese mythology.

In Norse mythology, Huginn (from the Old Norse for "thought") and Muninn (from the Old Norse for "memory" or "mind") are a pair of ravens that fly all over the world of humans, Midgard, and bring the god Odin information. Additionally, among the Norse, raven banner standards were carried by such figures as the Jarls of Orkney, King Cnut the Great of England, Norway, and Denmark, and Harald Hardrada.

In the British Isles, ravens also were symbolic to the Celts. In Irish mythology, the goddess Morrígan alighted on the hero Cú Chulainn's shoulder in the form of a raven after his death. In Welsh mythology they were associated with the Welsh god Brân the Blessed, whose name translates to "raven" and "crow". According to the Mabinogion, Brân's head was buried in the White Hill of London as a talisman against invasion.

A legend developed that England would not fall to a foreign invader as long as there were ravens at the Tower of London; although this is often thought to be an ancient belief, the official Tower of London historian, Geoff Parnell, believes that this is actually a romantic Victorian invention.

In the Jewish, Christian and Islamic traditions, the raven was the first animal to be released from Noah's Ark. "So it came to pass, at the end of forty days, that Noah opened the window of the ark which he had made. Then he sent out a raven, which kept going to and fro until the waters had dried up from the earth. He also sent out from himself a dove, to see if the waters had receded from the face of the ground." The raven is mentioned 12 times in the Bible. In the New Testament Jesus tells a parable using the raven to show how people should rely on God for their needs and not riches (Luke 12:24). The raven is also mentioned in the Quran at the story of Cain and Abel. Adam's firstborn son Cain kills his brother Abel, but he does not know what to do with the corpse: "Then Allah sent a raven scratching up the ground, to show him how to hide his brother's naked corpse. He said: Woe unto me! Am I not able to be as this raven and so hide my brother's naked corpse? And he became repentant."
