= Why We Run =

2001 book

- Original title: Racing the Antelope: What Animals Can Teach Us About Running and Ourselves
- Subject: Running; comparative physiology
- Publisher: HarperCollins
- Publication date: 2001
- Pages: 292
- Dewey Decimal: 612.044
- LC Class: QP310.R85

Why We Run: A Natural History is a non-fiction book by author and biologist Bernd Heinrich and was originally published as Racing the Antelope: What Animals Can Teach Us About Running and Ourselves.

== Synopsis ==
The narrator, Heinrich, writes about the challenges that he faced in his life and in writing the book. It explains why humans endure ultramarathons. One segment focuses on the time Heinrich came first in the Golden Gate Marathon in the 1980s. During the ultra-marathon, Heinrich drank Ocean Spray cranberry juice rather than water, stating that it was sugar that kept him running throughout the 100 kilometres (62 mi).

The book is organised into chapters detailing different animals and their ability to use their natural advantages for greatest endurance and explains how Heinrich used this knowledge to become an ultra-runner. Why We Run focuses on how antelope, deer, wolves, bees, frogs, camels and other animals exhibit endurance techniques that humans later adopted. For example, antelopes travel in packs and "leap frog" from back to front to conserve energy and escape predators. Deer are natural sprinters and sprint to escape predators. Wolves, like endurance runners, chase sprinting prey to tire them. Camels are adapted to fat storage and usage in order to conserve water in their harsh environment. Birds have a majority of slow twitch fibrous muscles that are adapted for long travel times as well as the ability to simultaneously inhale and exhale. The book concludes as Heinrich completes an ultra-marathon and reflects on the biology, anthropology, psychology and philosophy that affected his life along with the animals and their metabolic functions.

== Racing the Antelope ==
Why We Run: A Natural History was originally released as Racing The Antelope, What Animals Can Teach Us about Running and Ourselves. The title was changed due to a complaint from Sean Gibbon, author of Run Like the Antelope, a book about the rock band Phish. In order to distinguish his work from that work, Heinrich and his editor Daniel Halpern switched. Bernd Heinrich stated that this new title worked just as well since a new book had been released titled Running after Antelope by Scott Carrier. With an influx of antelope-titled books, Heinrich stated that the new title was more appropriate.

== Critical response ==
Why We Run: A Natural History gained mostly favorable reviews from Google Books and Barnes & Noble. Reviewers stated that Heinrich's writing is passionate and engaging, with many comments that he leads an interesting life. However, the focus on animal physiology was found convoluted and little tied to other chapters until the end. Other reviewers found that many facts were "mushy" and are not integrated. Positive reviews from New York Times, Publishers Weekly, and positive aggregated reviews earned Why We Run: A Natural History best-seller status on Amazon.com, where it reached 19th place in popularity for science and wildlife books.

Aggregate Reviews
Source	Rating
Amazon.com	3.8/5
Barnes & Noble	3.5/5
Google books	3/5
