= Hrefna Sigurjónsdóttir =

Icelandic academic

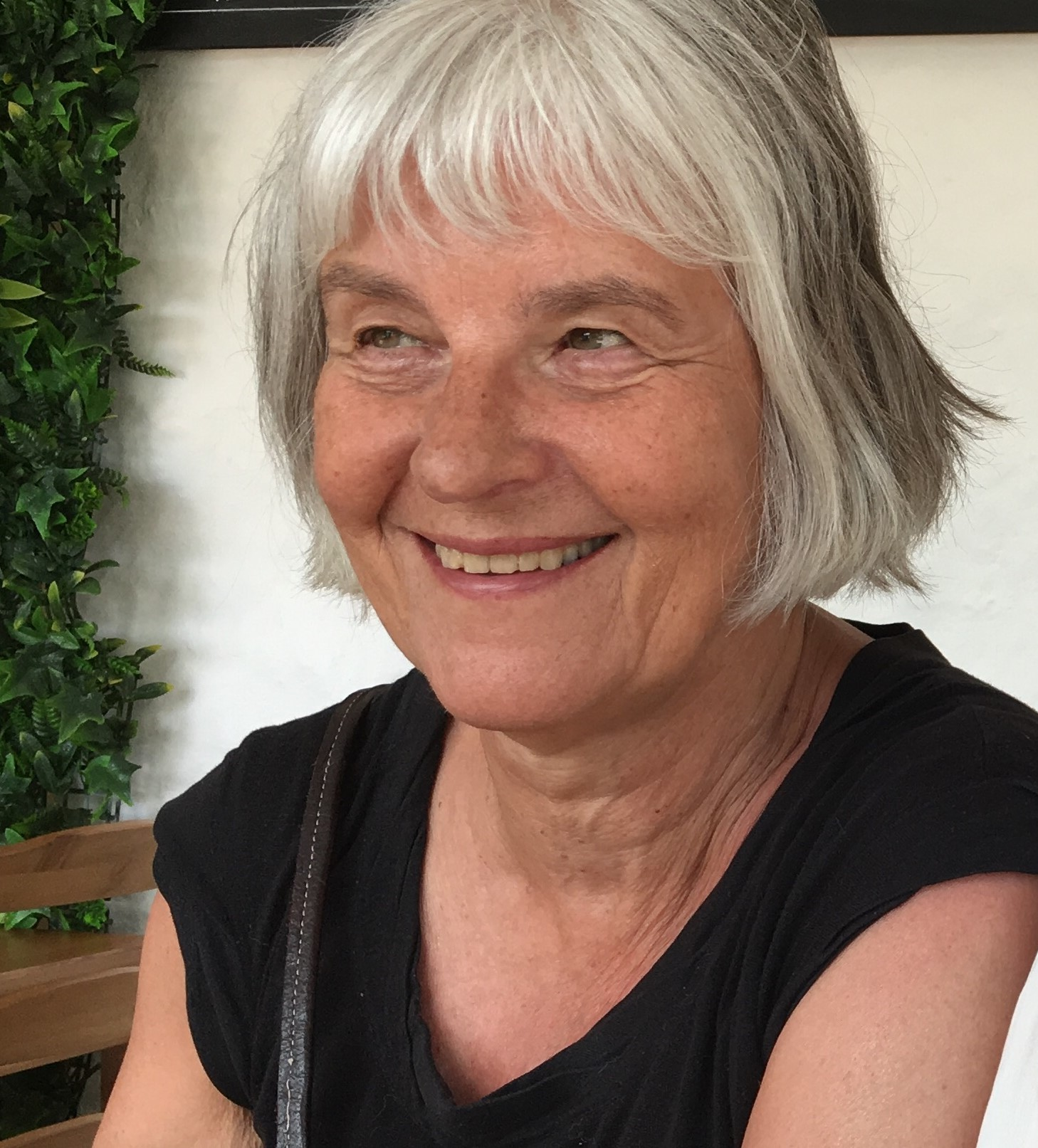
- Born: 24 October 1950 (age 75)
- Occupations: biologist and professor at the University of Iceland

Hrefna Sigurjónsdóttir (born 24 October 1950) is a biologist and a professor at the University of Iceland.

== Professional career ==
Hrefna completed the national standard lower secondary school examination from Kvennaskólinn í Reykjavík (Reykjavik Women's Gymnasium) in 1966 and a matriculation examination from the Mathematics Department of Menntaskólinn í Reykjavík (Reykjavik Junior College) in the spring of 1970. She graduated from the University of Iceland (UI) with a BS (90e) in biology in the spring of 1973. Her final project was on the ecology of insects. A year later, she finished a graduate program from the same department (BS 120e), emphasising insects and other land arthropods. She investigated their abundance and distribution on the south side and top of Mt. Esja. She pursued studies in ecology at University College of North Wales, Bangor, (1975-1976) and completed a master's there. The research project was on competition for food between closely related freshwater flatworms. She worked under the supervision of Prof. T. Reynoldson. Hrefna started a doctoral programme in 1977 in the Zoology Department of the University of Liverpool in England and completed it in 1980. Her supervisor there was Professor G.A. Parker who was a pioneer in evolutionary studies emphasising reproductive behaviour and evolution of differences between the sexes and had worked a great deal on the yellow dung fly. Hrefna's doctoral project was in this field, where the emphasis is to interpret animals' behaviour, in the light of ecology and evolution (behaviour ecology/sociobiology). The title of the dissertation is Evolutionary Aaspects of Sexual Dimorphism in Size: Studies on Dung Flies and Three Groups of Birds. She was the first woman in Iceland to complete a doctorate in animal ethology. After returning home, she completed teacher certification at the University of Iceland (1982).

During her years of study, she worked one summer at the Icelandic Fisheries Laboratories (1971). In 1973 and 1974 she assisted Prof. Arnþór Garðarson (UI) with research on the vegetation in the Þjórsá River Wetlands. In the summers of 1975 and 1977, she worked for Prof. Agnar Ingólfsson (UI) doing research on the distribution of coastal invertebrates in Iceland. She assisted with practical teaching in ecology and zoology with her studies in winter 1974–1975. After finishing her doctoral programme, she taught part-time at the Biology Department of the University of Iceland and Hamrahlíð Junior College (two years). In the fall of 1982, she was hired as assistant professor in biology at Iceland University of Education (KHI) and was promoted to associate professor in 1987 and then to professor in 1999. With the merger of Iceland University of Education and the University of Iceland in 2008, she became professor at UI's School of Education. Her students at the School of Education have been pre-service teachers selecting biology/natural science as their major and in-service teachers who have been doing continuing education courses in biology, environmental education and outdoor education. At the University of Iceland, she was the principal teacher in ethology (animal behaviour) first in spring 1981 and then, usually, every other year – last in 2018. She has supervised students (Icelandic and French) in master's studies in ethology, in addition to many teacher education students in their final projects for B.Ed. and M.Ed. degrees. She has also taught a course on the ethology of horses at Hólar University College, Iceland (2011-2013).

== Research ==
Hrefna's research in biology has focused on ethology (behavioural ecology). For example, she has worked on the reproductive behaviour of dung flies and arctic char. Since 1996, she has worked with many experts and students on the (social) behaviour of the Icelandic horse, focusing on dominance orders, what determines an individual horse's positioning, and friendship patterns, how their behaviour (aggression, mutual grooming) is affected by group composition in pastures, their behaviour and time budget in the wintertime and with French colleagues on the natural weaning of foals. Her research has received support from the Icelandic Centre for Research, UI's Research Fund and other parties. In addition, the research has been presented at many conferences and meetings in many parts of the world and published in peer reviewed journals.

Hrefna has participated in studies in natural science education, given talks, written articles and chapters in books on educational theory on biology and environmental education, written course materials for elementary schools in zoology and made a film on the reproductive behaviour of arctic char in Lake Thingvallavatn, along with Karl Gunnarsson. She belonged to a workgroup of the National Centre for Educational Materials and was for a long time a counsellor at the centre regarding translations and the selection of course materials in biology.

== Other work and projects ==
Hrefna has been trusted to serve in various committees where full confidence is needed at the University of Iceland and outside it. She was the first woman member of the Student Council's Board of Directors 1973–1974. At KHI, for example, she was a department chair, a member of the School Council, semester manager, member of the Continuing Education's Faculty Council, and chair of the selection committee. After merger of the Universities, she was a member of the Faculty Council of the Faculty of Teachers. She was the chair of the Electives Division and is now the School of Education's representative on UI's Promotion Committee. She was on the selection committee of the Agricultural University of Iceland in Hvanneyri and was appointed to the selection committee for the Knowledge Centre in the Faroe Islands. She has been a member of the professional group of natural and environmental sciences for The Icelandic Centre for Research. She sat on the Professional Council of Hagþenkir, Association of Non-fiction Writers, for several years, and on the Allocation Committee of the Board of Directors of the Association of Self-employed Scholars. She was a member of the Board of Directors of KHI's Teachers Association and a confidante for six years and on the Board of Directors of the Professors Association in Iceland and its representative to a consultants group for a wages committee for many years.

Hrefna has been a member on the boards of directors of professional associations and interest associations in the fields of biology and conservation. She sat on the Board of Directors of the Biology Association of Iceland and was on the editorial board of Náttúrufræðingur (Natural Scientist) for the Icelandic Natural History Association (HÍN = NHA) for 28 years. She was twice a member of the Board of Directors of Landvernd, Icelandic Environment Association (7 years). She was on the Board of Directors of the Southwest Iceland Nature Conservation Association (4 years). She chaired the Board of Directors of Reykjanesfólkvangur (outdoor recreational area) and is now a member of NHA's Board of Directors for the second time.

== Childhood and personal life ==
Hrefna grew up in Reykjavik but always spent her summers in the countryside as a child and youth. Parents: Sigurjón Sigurðsson, banker (b. 1920, d. 2013), and Björg Ólafsdóttir (b. 1921). Her husband is Sigurður Sveinn Snorrason, professor in biology at the University of Iceland. They have two children, Björg and Snorri.

== Main written works ==
=== Articles ===
- Sigurjónsdóttir, H and G.A. Parker. 1981. Dung fly struggles: evidence for assessment strategy. Behavioral Ecology and Sociobiology, 8: 219–230.
- Sigurjónsdóttir, H. and Gunnarsson, K. 1989. Alternative mating tactics of arctic charr, Salvelinus alpinus, in Thingvallavatn, Iceland. Environmental Biology of Fishes 26: 159–176.
- Hrefna Sigurjónsdóttir, M. van Dierendonck, Anna G. Þórhallsdóttir and Sigurður Snorrason. 2003. Social relationships in a group of horses without a mature stallion. Behaviour, 140: 783–804.
- Hrefna Sigurjónsdóttir and Hans Haraldsson. (2019). Significance of Group Composition for the Welfare of Pastured Horses. Animals, 9, 14.
- Hrefna Sigurjónsdóttir og Sandra M. Granquist. (2019). Hátterni hesta í haga - Rannsóknir á félagshegðun. Náttúrufræðingurinn 89 (3-4) bl. 78–97, 2019.
- Henry, S.; Sigurjónsdóttir, H.; Klapper, A.; Joubert, J.; Montier, G.; Hausberger, M. Domestic Foal Weaning: Need for Re-Thinking Breeding Practices? Animals 2020, 10, 361.

=== Books ===
- Agnar Ingólfsson, Eggert Pétursson, Hrefna Sigurjónsdóttir og Karl Gunnarsson. 1986. Fjörulíf. Fræðslurit Ferðafélags Íslands nr.2, 116 bls. Ferðafélag Íslands. Reykjavík.

=== Curriculum material ===
- Komdu að skoða hvað dýrin gera. Co-author: Sólrún Harðardóttir.
- Greiningarlyklar fyrir smádýr. Co-author: Snorri Sigurðsson.
- Æxlunarhegðun bleikju í Þingvallavatni – educational film. Co-author: Karl Gunnarsson.
- Æxlunarhegðun bleikju í Þingvallavatni – teaching instructions with a video.
