= Raven Hail =

Cherokee writer (1921–2005)

Raven Hail was a member of the Cherokee Nation known for her writings on Cherokee culture.

== Early life ==
Hail was born in 1921 in Washington County, Oklahoma, a member of the Cherokee Nation. In her early life, Hail lived with her mother on designated Cherokee grounds in Welch, Oklahoma. She attended West Anthracite and Prairie Center elementary schools before attending Oklahoma State University and Southern Methodist University.

While in Texas, Hail worked as a bookkeeper and secretary. She unsuccessfully campaigned for the Texas legislature in 1972. She established the American Indian Theater in Dallas, Texas in 1963; the group toured Dallas and presented examples of Indian arts. Hail was a singer whose songs are preserved on an album called The Raven Sings. She was also a writer of plays such as The Raven and the Redbird, a newsletter called The Raven Speaks that was published from 1968 until 1972, and books on foods associated with Cherokee culture. Hale owned a bookstore called Ravenscove and led traditional instructions on Cherokee beadwork, basketry, singing, dancing, and folklore, preserving Native culture.

In 1997 Hail was living in Mesa, Arizona, and spending her time writing about Cherokee culture. She then moved to North Carolina.

Hail died in 2005.

== Selected publications ==
- Hail, Raven (1965-01-01). The Raven and the Redbird – Sam Houston and his Cherokee Wife. Raven Hail.
- Hail, Raven. Native American foods : foods the Indians gave us. OCLC 26017509.
- Hail, Raven (1986). Windsong: Texas Cherokee Princess. Raven Hail Books. ISBN 978-0-9617696-1-1.
- Hail, Raven (2000). The Cherokee Sacred Calendar: A Handbook of the Ancient Native American Tradition. Destiny Books. ISBN 978-0-89281-804-4.

== Awards and honors ==
Hail's poem "Magic Song of the Little People" won best poem in a native language award from the Southwest Association of Indian Arts in 1995.
