= Bernd Heinrich =

American biologist

Bernd Heinrich (born April 19, 1940 in Bad Polzin, Germany (now Połczyn-Zdrój, Poland)), is a professor emeritus in the biology department at the University of Vermont and is the author of a number of books about nature and biology. Heinrich has made major contributions to the study of insect physiology and behavior, as well as bird behavior. In addition to many scientific publications, Heinrich has written over a dozen highly praised books, mostly related to his research examining the physiological, ecological and behavioral adaptations of animals and plants to their physical environments. He has also written books that include more of his personal reflections on nature. He is the son of ichneumon expert Gerd Heinrich.

== Education ==
Heinrich attended Grundschule Trittau (1946–1950) and college at the University of Maine. He then earned his Ph.D. in 1970 from the University of California, Los Angeles. In 1971, he accepted a position at the University of California, Berkeley where he became a professor of entomology. Between 1976 and 1977 he was a Guggenheim and Harvard Fellow. In 1980 Heinrich accepted a position as a professor of zoology/biology at the University of Vermont. From 1988 to 1989 he was a von Humboldt Fellow.

== Scientific career ==
Heinrich is distinguished by his research work in the comparative physiology and behavior of insects. His work has elucidated new physiological mechanisms of temperature regulation of tropical versus temperate moths, bumblebees versus honeybees, beetles, dragonflies, flies, and butterflies, all done while at UCLA and Berkeley. After he moved back to Maine and started teaching at the University of Vermont, his comparative work on insect physiology led to behavioral and ecological studies from the perspective of all animals (e.g., comparisons of food sharing between social bumblebees and territorial ravens). His many years of research on ravens has culminated in numerous scientific papers on raven behavior and two books that put the research into a broad context.

Heinrich's often popular books range from biologic detective stories (Ravens in Winter) to scientific specialties of field (The Hot-blooded Insects) to adventure and biography (The Snoring Bird) to human evolution (Why We Run). Many of these books are based on his original research documented in his more than 100 articles in refereed scientific journals.

== Running career ==
Heinrich has won numerous long-distance running events and set a number of open U.S. ultramarathon and masters (age 40 and over) records throughout the 1980s. At the age of 39, Heinrich prefaced his masters career by winning the Golden Gate Marathon outright, with a time of 2:29:16, on a hilly course in San Francisco, California. In 1980, Heinrich ran 2:22:34, his lifetime personal best, in the West Valley Marathon in San Mateo, California, where he placed third and missed qualifying for the 1980 U.S. Olympic Marathon trials by just forty seconds. On April 21, 1980, two days after his 40th birthday, he was the first masters finisher at the Boston Marathon, with a time of 2:25:25, good for 51st place overall.

Heinrich then left marathons and moved to ultramarathoning. In 1981, he set several records during a combined 50 mile/100 kilometer road race in Chicago. In the 50 mile race, his second-place finish was a new World record for masters runners. Moreover, he continued running, and in the 100 kilometer race set an absolute American record (i.e., the best of either road or track venues) of 6:38:21 for 100 kilometers. This result was also a World record for masters runners.

In 1983, he set an absolute American record for the 24-hour run of 156 miles, 1388 yards in a track race in Maine. In 1984, he set an absolute American 100 mile record of 12:27:01, again in a track race. One year later, he set the American track record of 7:00:12 for 100 kilometers. In so doing, he became the only American man to hold both the road and track versions of the American record for the same event. His 12:27:01 for 100 miles and 7:00:12 for 100 kilometers still remained, at the end of 2007, the official American track records. In his career, Heinrich set American national records for any age in the standard ultramarathon distances of 100 kilometers, 200 kilometers, 100 miles, and longest distance run in 24 hours. At the end of 2007, Heinrich was inducted into the American Ultrarunning Association's Hall of Fame.

In his book Why We Run: A Natural History (originally titled "Racing the Antelope"), Heinrich reflected on the sport of running as a scientist, and recounted his performance in the 100 kilometer race that began his ultra-marathon career. Combining his expertise as a physiologist, comparative animal biologist specializing in exercise and temperature regulation, and runner, he posits that the unique human capacity for long-distance running in heat is a human adaptation similar to running adaptations in other animals. Another argument of the book was that humans evolved to be ultra-distance runners that could run down even the swiftest prey, through a combination of endurance, intelligence, and the desire to win (cf. Persistence hunting).

== Books ==
- Bumblebee Economics (Harvard University Press, 1979)
- Insect Thermoregulation (John Wiley & Sons, 1981)
- In a Patch of Fireweed: A Biologist's Life in the Field (Harvard University Press, 1984)
- One Man's Owl (Princeton University Press, 1987)
- Ravens in Winter (Summit Books, 1989)
- The Hot-Blooded Insects: Strategies and Mechanisms of Thermoregulation (Harvard University Press, 1993)
- A Year in the Maine Woods (Addison-Wesley, 1994)
- The Thermal Warriors: Strategies of Insect Survival (Harvard University Press, 1996)
- The Trees in my Forest (Addison-Wesley, 1997)
- Mind of the Raven: Investigations and Adventures With Wolf-Birds (HarperCollins, 1999)
- Racing the Antelope: What Animals Can Teach Us About Running and Life (HarperCollins, 2001), later republished as Why We Run: A Natural History
- Winter World: The Ingenuity of Animal Survival (HarperCollins, 2003)
- The Geese of Beaver Bog (HarperCollins, 2004)
- The Snoring Bird: My Family's Journey Through a Century of Biology (HarperCollins, 2007)
- Summer World: A Season of Bounty (HarperCollins, 2009)
- The Nesting Season: Cuckoos, Cuckolds and the Invention of Monogamy (Harvard University Press, 2010)
- Life Everlasting: The Animal Way of Death (Houghton Mifflin Harcourt, 2012)
- The Homing Instinct: Meaning & Mystery in Animal Migration (Houghton Mifflin Harcourt, 2014)
- One Wild Bird at a Time: Portraits of Individual Lives (Houghton Mifflin Harcourt, 2016)
- The Naturalist's Notebook:Tracking Changes in the Natural World Around You (co-authored by Nathaniel T. Wheelwright; Storey Publishing, 2017)
- White Feathers: The Nesting Lives of Tree Swallows (Houghton Mifflin Harcourt, 2020)
- Racing the Clock: A Running Life With Nature (Ecco, 2021)

The Common Uncommon: A Forest Journey (W.W. Norton & Co., Inc. 2026)

== Documentary films ==
In 2011, a 60-minute film, titled An Uncommon Curiosity: at home & in nature with Bernd Heinrich was released. The film follows Bernd Heinrich over the course of a year as he reflects on his past and shares his ideas about nature, science, art, beauty, writing, and running.

Heinrich was featured in a documentary film series called The Truth About Trees, a production of the James Agee Film Project, which was released in 2015.
