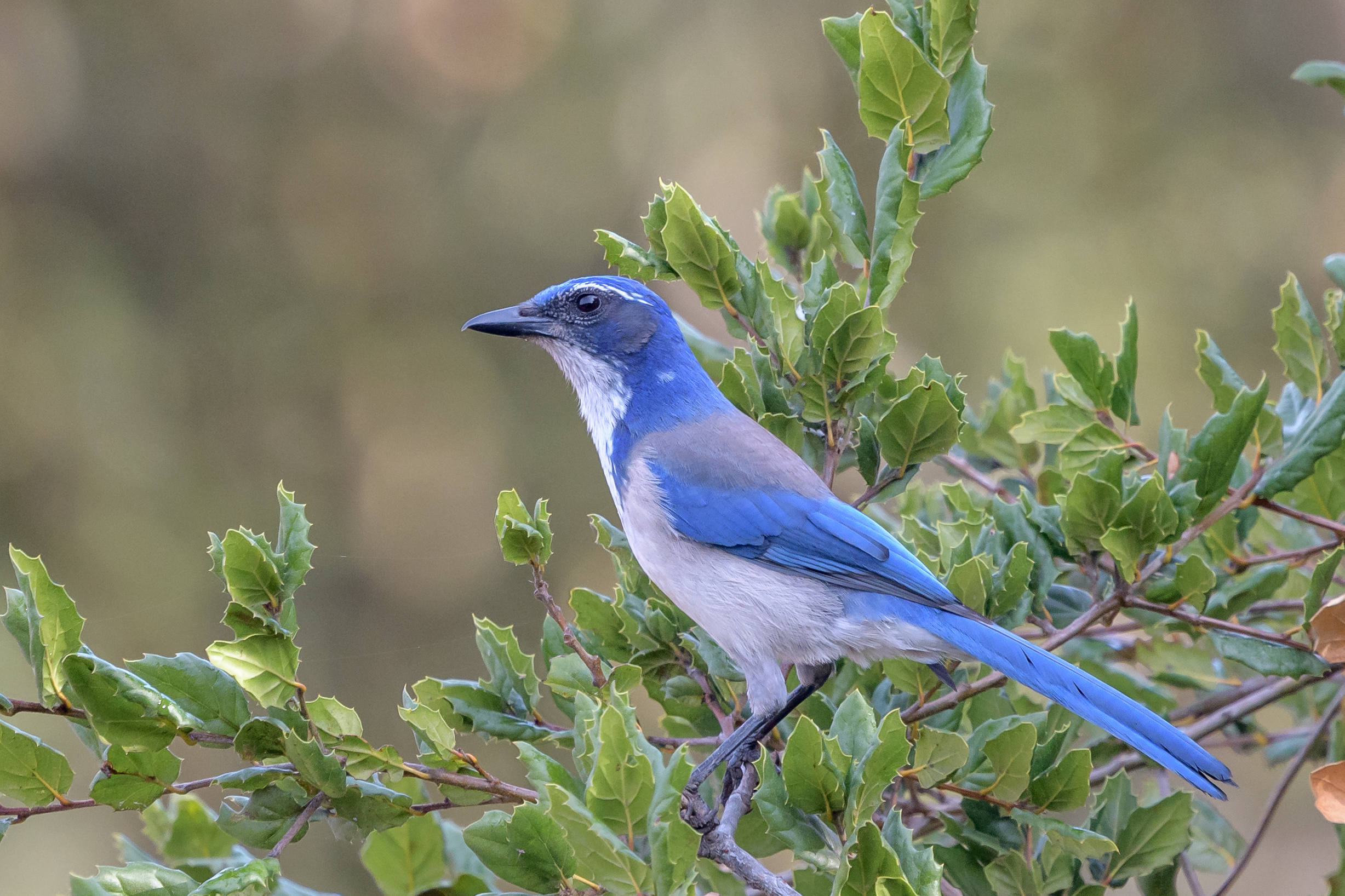
- Sobrante Ridge Regional Preserve, Richmond, Contra Costa County, California
- Sounds

Conservation status
- Least Concern (IUCN 3.1)

Scientific classification
- Kingdom: Animalia
- Phylum: Chordata
- Class: Aves
- Order: Passeriformes
- Family: Corvidae
- Genus: Aphelocoma
- Species: A. californica

Binomial name
- Aphelocoma californica (Vigors, 1839)

Subspecies
- See text

= California scrub jay =

Species of bird in the crow family

The California scrub jay (Aphelocoma californica) is a species of scrub jay native to western North America. It ranges from southern British Columbia throughout California and western Nevada near Reno to west of the Sierra Nevada. The California scrub jay was once lumped with Woodhouse's scrub jay and collectively called the western scrub jay. IUCN and the Handbook of the Birds of the World maintain this lumped taxon. The group was also lumped with the island scrub jay and the Florida scrub jay; the taxon was then called simply scrub jay. The California scrub jay is nonmigratory and can be found in urban areas, where it can become tame and will come to bird feeders. While many refer to scrub jays as "blue jays", the blue jay is a different species of bird entirely.

== Etymology ==
The generic name, Aphelocoma, derives from Latinized Ancient Greek apheles- (from ἀφελής-) "simple" + Latin coma (from Greek kome κόμη) "hair", in reference to the lack of striped or banded feathers in this genus, compared to other jays. The species name, californica, is Latin for "from California".

== Description ==
The California scrub jay is a medium-sized bird, approximately 27–31 cm (11–12 in) in length (including its tail), with a 39 cm (15 in) wingspan, and about 80 g (2.8 oz) in weight. In general, this species has a blue head, wings, and tail; a gray-brown back; grayish underparts; and white eyebrows. The throat is whitish with a blue necklace. The call or "squawk" is described as "harsh and angry-sounding".

== Behavior ==
=== Habitat ===
True to its name, the California scrub jay inhabits areas of low scrub, preferring pinyon-juniper forests, oak woods, and edges of mixed evergreen forests. It also inhabits suburban gardens.

==== Range expansion ====
The California scrub jay's range has been expanding north over time. Although they were not seen at all during breeding bird surveys in Washington state in the early 1970s, by 2020 scrub jays are commonly found in the Puget Sound and even as far as British Columbia.

=== Urbanization effects ===
Urbanization alters behavior, diet, and social interactions along with the way of life for wildlife, including the California scrub jay. However, urbanization can reduce natural habitat, increasing exposure to hazards including traffic, domestic pets, and human disturbance. But, scrub jays are among the bird species that can live in and take advantage of urban landscapes.

In coastal southern California, residential development has divided native coastal sage scrub and chaparral habitat into smaller fragments, and many shrubland birds have declined in these fragments. Scrub jays, however, can use the surrounding urban areas and do not appear to be sensitive to the size of habitat fragments. In surveys of coastal sage scrubs in San Diego County, they were more abundant near the urban edge than in the interior of large habitat blocks.

Urban parks and gardens provide additional food sources for the jays. These include bird feeders set up by humans for recreation or for conservation purposes. California scrub jays are known to be accustomed to human presence and take advantage of the resources provided by these residential areas. Their ability to remember locations of hidden caches help the jays use resources across different environments.

Because they are more common along edges, scrub jays have been named as possible nest predators of other birds. However, a study of rufous-crowned sparrow nests found no difference in nest predation between edge and interior habitat, and most of the predation events observed were by snakes.

=== Foraging ===
California scrub jays usually forage in pairs, family groups, or small non-kin groups, outside of the breeding season. They feed on small animals, such as frogs and lizards, eggs and young of other birds, insects, and (particularly in winter) grains, nuts, and berries. They will also eat fruit and vegetables growing in backyards.

=== Vocalization ===
The vocalizations of corvids are typically referred to as calls rather than songs, and evidence that they learn their species-specific calls has been limited. In one reported case, a hand-raised California scrub jay housed in an aviary with Florida scrub jays produced two call types that closely matched those of the Florida birds, rather than any known California scrub jay calls. The authors interpreted this as evidence of vocal learning and suggested that some geographic variation in scrub jay calls may be traditional.

=== Food storing ===
California scrub jays, like many other corvids, exploit ephemeral surpluses by storing food in scattered caches within their territories. They rely on highly accurate and complex memories to recover the hidden caches, often after long periods of time. In the process of collecting and storing this food, they have shown an ability to plan ahead in choosing cache sites to provide adequate food volume and variety for the future. Western scrub jays are also able to rely on their accurate observational spatial memories to steal food from caches made by conspecifics. Food-storing birds implement a number of strategies to protect their caches from potential 'pilferers.'

Anecdotally, scrub jays – and corvids more generally – are known for an attraction to, and thievery of, brightly colored objects. Recent research debunks, or at least casts doubt, on this idea. Corvids have been observed taking acorns from acorn woodpecker caches. Some scrub jays snatch acorns from the hiding places of other jays. When these birds go to hide their own acorns, they check first that no other jays are watching. Other protection methods include moving the cache in the presence of an observer, storing inedible decoys like small stones instead of food, and hiding the cache once a scavenging bird is no longer watching; these behaviors are thought to vary based on the presence or absence of potential pilferers (like other corvids) as well as what kind of animal might pilfer the cache, implying strategic and socially complex motives behind different kinds of caching behavior.

=== Intelligence ===
Recent research has suggested that western scrub jays, along with several other corvids, are among the most intelligent of animals. The brain-to-body mass ratio of adult scrub jays rivals that of chimpanzees and cetaceans, and is dwarfed only by that of humans. Scrub jays are also the only non-primate or non-dolphin shown to plan ahead for the future (known as metacognition), which was previously thought of as a uniquely human trait. Scrub jays have also been shown to look for information about the location of hidden food more often when they were uncertain, similar to apes in a comparable task. Whether tasks like this truly measure metacognition is still debated. Other studies have shown that they can remember locations of over 200 food caches, as well as the food item in each cache and its rate of decay. To protect their caches from pilfering conspecifics, scrub jays will choose locations out of sight of their competitors, or re-cache caches once they are alone, suggesting that they can take into account the perspective of others.

California scrub jays also summon others to screech over the body of a dead jay, according to research from the University of California, Davis. The birds' cacophonous "funerals" can last for up to half an hour.

Scrub jays have also been tested on self-control. In a large comparative study of motor self-regulation, California scrub jays and Eurasian jays performed relatively poorly compared with mammals, but three other corvid species tested later ranked among the top performers, which suggests that a few species may not represent the whole group.

Scrub jays more recently have been tested for mirrored self-recognition, and ability thought to be linked to more complex social thinking. In a study of seven captive jays, the birds cached more food when another jay was watching than when a mirror was present, and they did not protect their caches more with a mirror than when caching alone. This suggests the jays may not have treated their reflection as another bird. However, in a “mark test,” where a sticker was placed on the throat, the jays did not try to remove a red mark more often in front of a mirror than without one, so the study found no clear evidence of mirror self-recognition. The authors described the results as mixed and noted that the mark test may not work well for every species.

=== Nesting ===
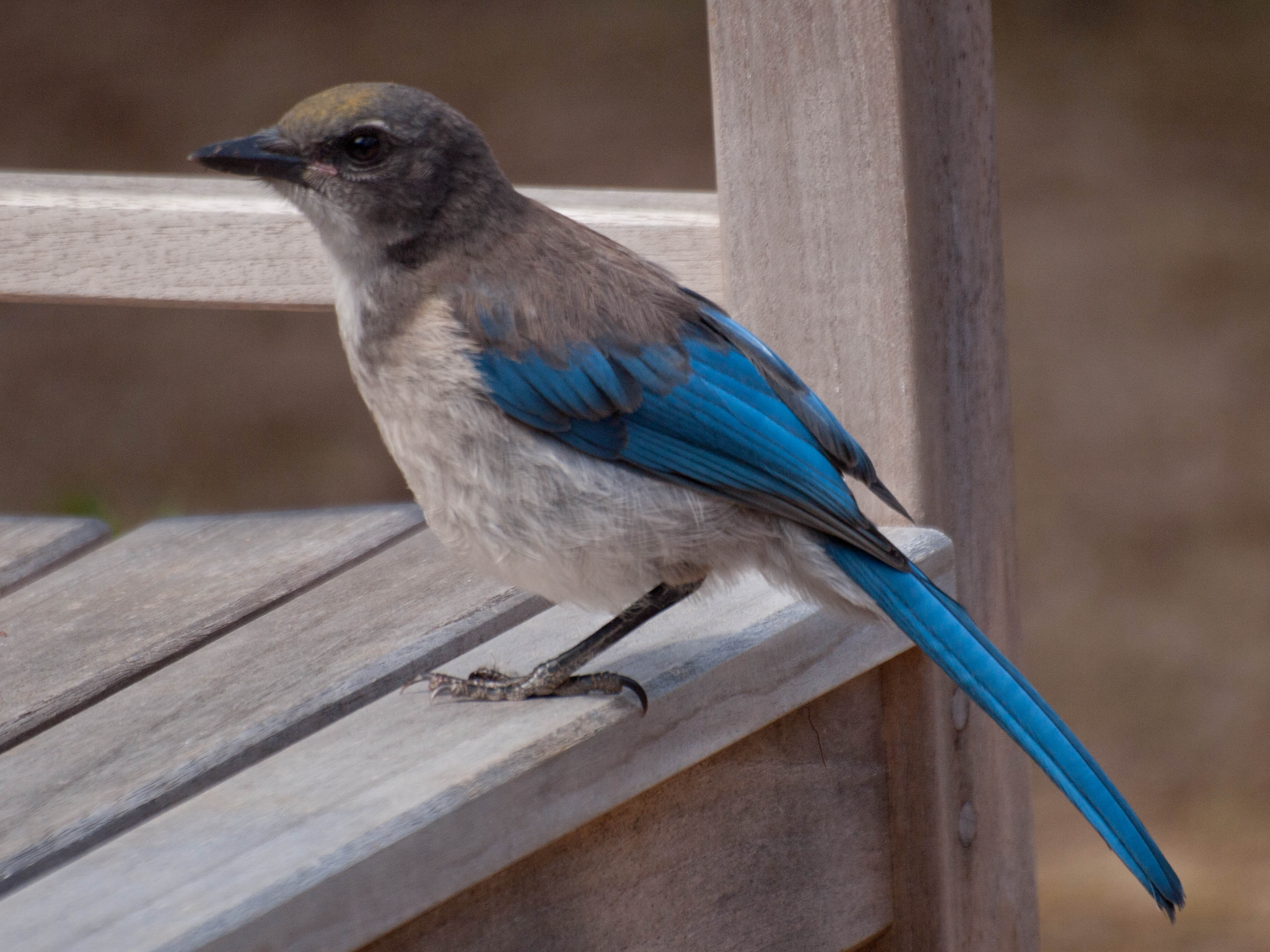
Juvenile in California, USA

Nests are built low in trees or bushes, 1–10 m (3.3–32.8 ft) above the ground, primarily by the female, while the male guards her efforts. The nests are sturdy, with an outside diameter of 33–58 cm (13–23 in), constructed on a platform of twigs with moss and dry grasses lined with fine roots and hair. Four to six eggs are laid from March through July, with some regional variations. There are two common shell color variations: pale green with irregular, olive-colored spots or markings; and pale grayish-white to green with reddish-brown spots. The female incubates the eggs for about 16 days. The young leave the nest about 18 days after hatching.

=== Life span ===
The life span of wild California scrub jays is approximately 9 years. The oldest known western scrub jay was found in Castaic, California, in 1991 and raised in captivity. "Aaron" lived to be 19 years, and 8 months old.

=== Diseases ===
Populations are being adversely affected by the West Nile virus, particularly in California's Central Valley.

== Phylogeny ==
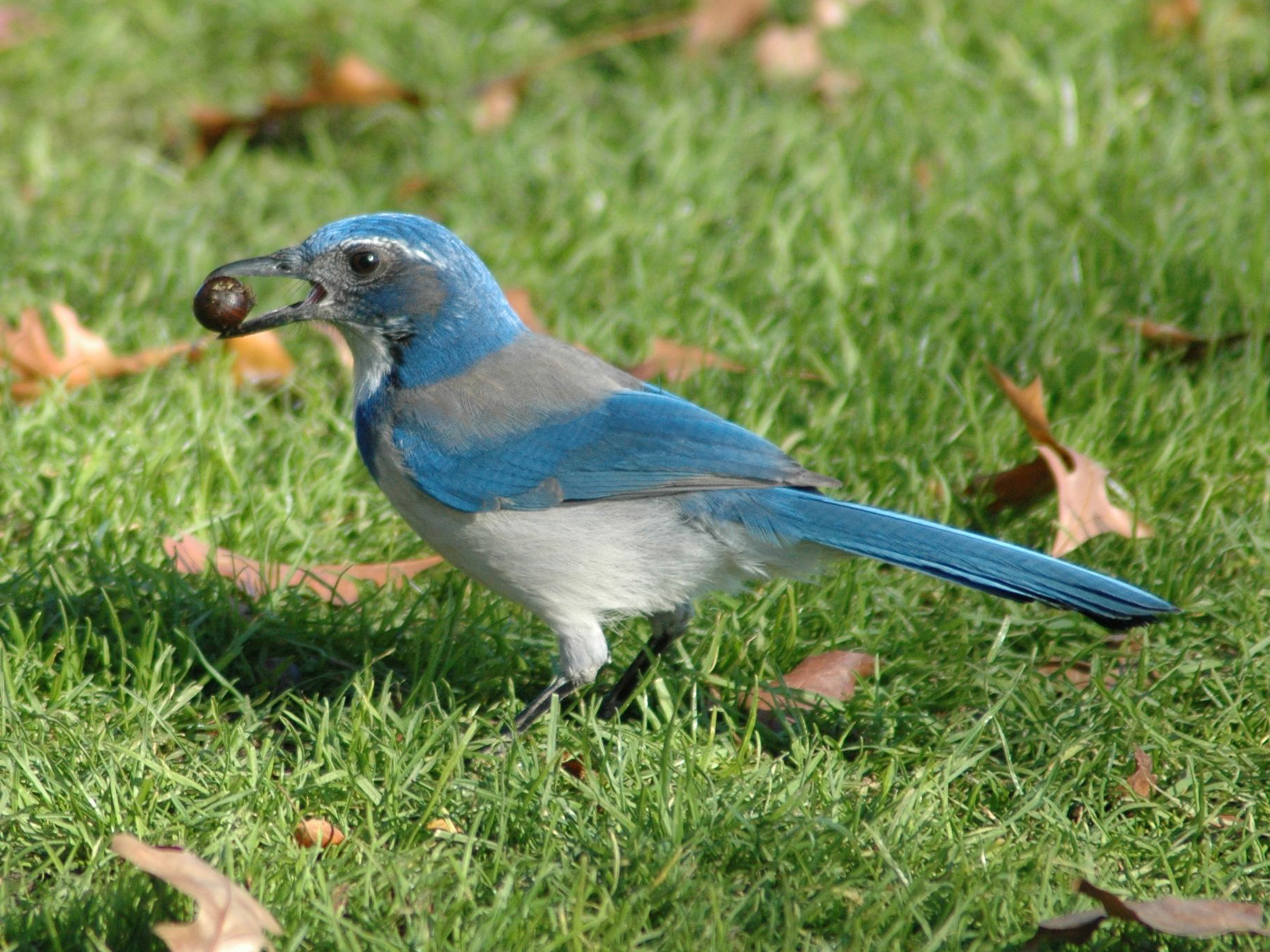
California scrub jay showing the well-marked breast band of the coastal races

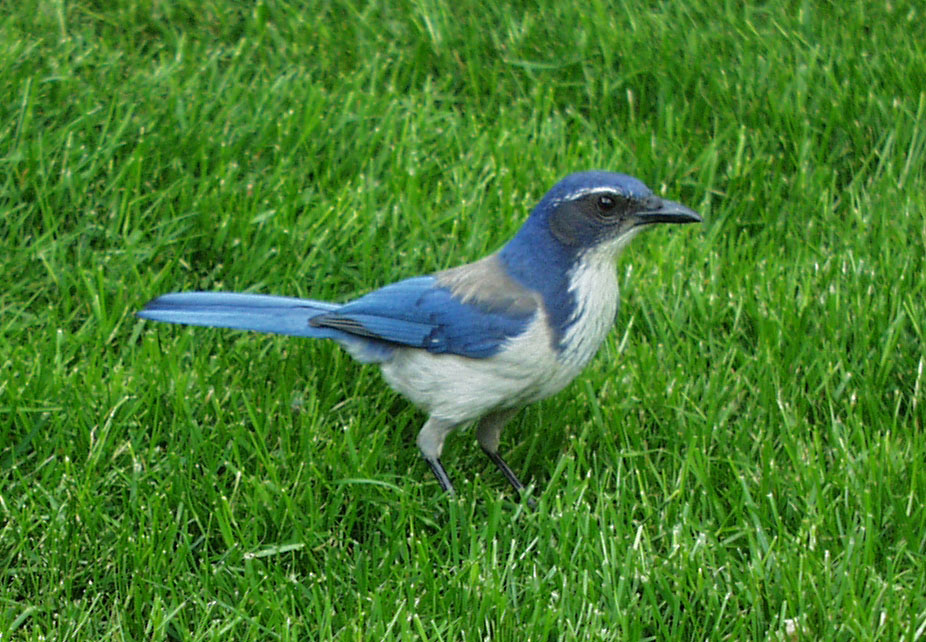
Note bright white plume breaking the breast band. Prominent markings in eye region are typical of male birds.

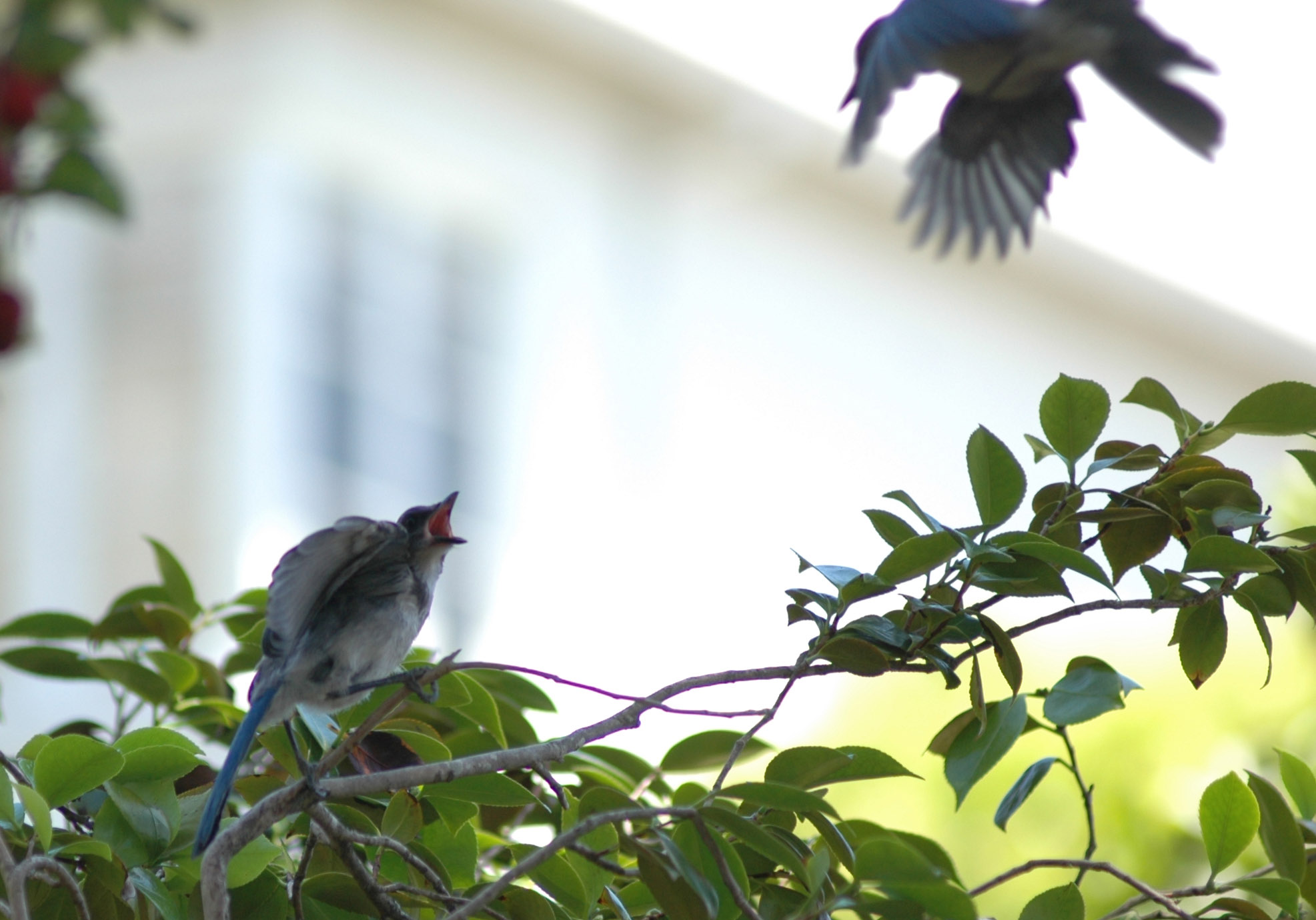
California scrub jay fledgling being fed

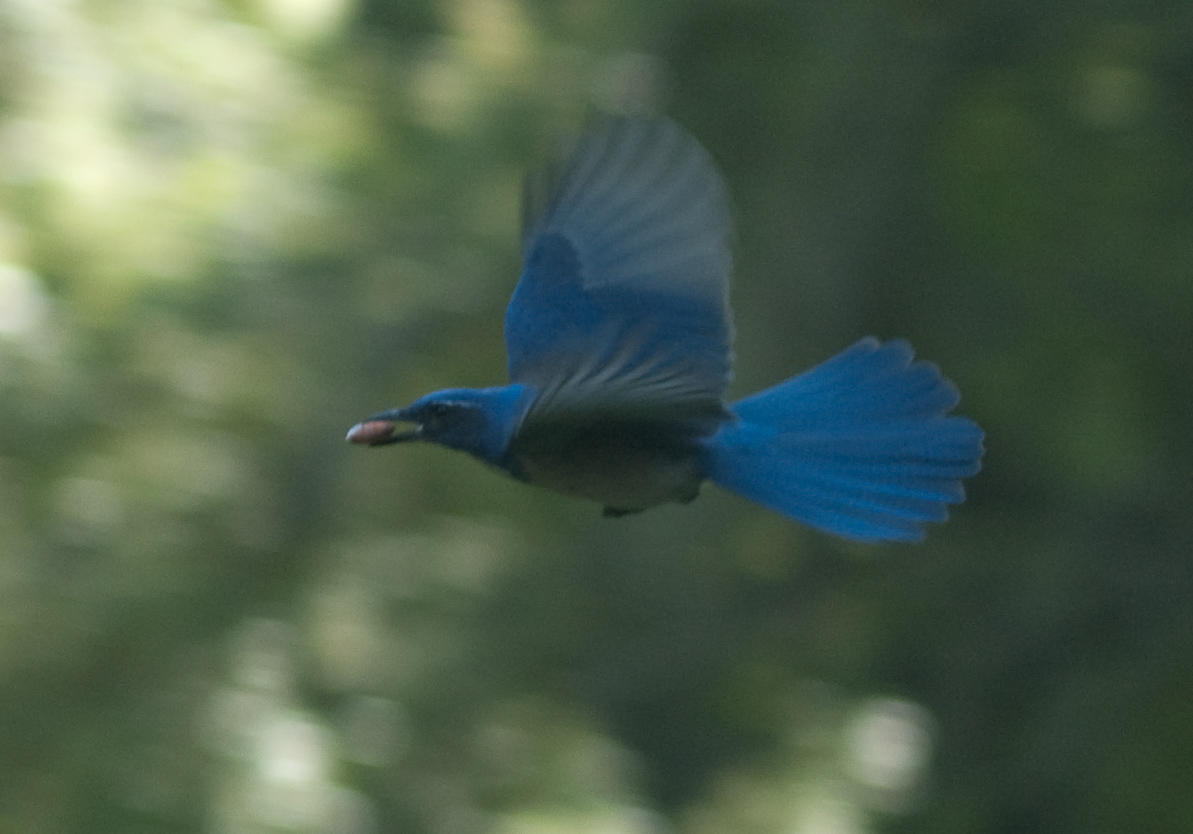
California scrub jay in flight

Woodhouse's, California, Island, and Florida scrub jay were once considered subspecies of a single "scrub jay" species. They are now believed to be distinct. Beyond the close relationship of the "California" and island scrub jays, resolution of their evolutionary history has proven very difficult.

Woodhouse's scrub jay differ in plumage (paler blue above, with an indistinct and usually incomplete breast band) from California scrub jay which is darker blue above with a strongly defined – but not necessarily complete – blue breast band.

The following subspecies are recognized:

Image	Subspecies	Common name	Description	Distribution
	Aphelocoma californica immanis Grinnell, 1901	Interior scrub jay	A large subspecies. Somewhat duller and lighter in color than californica due to gene flow from inland populations. Blue of head and neck less purplish than in woodhouseii group. Back usually quite brownish, underside and especially breast quite whitish, undertail coverts usually tinged pale blue or gray in males. Bill strong, wings and tail fairly short.	From Puget Sound through the Willamette Valley to Douglas County, Oregon
	Aphelocoma californica caurina Pitelka, 1951		Similar to californica, but head and back more intensely colored, with bright purplish tinge to blue of head. Color similar to nominate, thus darker than immanis and most oocleptica. Relative to nominate californica, blue areas more purplish and brighter, breast darker than rest of underside.	Coastal SW Oregon from Rogue River valley south to Napa and Sonoma Counties; eastern limit the inner California Coast Ranges.
	Aphelocoma californica oocleptica Swarth, 1918	Nicasio scrub jay (includes A. c. superciliosa)	Quite variable according to the extent of gene flow between this taxon and nevadae. Generally similar to californica but larger; color of head and neck varies in lightness and amount of purplish hue. Back grayish; undertail coverts usually white. Bill usually heavy but variable according to habitat type (less heavy in birds of pinyon woodland).	From Jackson, Klamath, and Lake Counties, Oregon, through Sacramento and San Joaquin Valleys and surrounding mountains to Kern County, San Francisco Bay area, and Alpine County. Eastwards to Inyo County and Virginia Mountains (Washoe County, Nevada), where it intergrades with nevadae of the woodhouseii group.
	Aphelocoma californica californica (Vigors, 1839)	California scrub jay	Blue of head usually strongly tinged purple. Back bluish-brownish gray, bluer towards the rump. Incomplete bluish-violet breast band. Underside greyish white, darker on the breast. Undertail coverts white tinged with blue. Thighs gray. Rectrices and remiges dark blue, the larger feathers duller. Bill heavy, tip strongly hooked.	California Coast Ranges from San Mateo County and SE Alameda County to SW Ventura County.
	Aphelocoma californica obscura Anthony, 1889	Belding's scrub jay	Smaller and darker than californica, with more intense purplish and brown coloration on head and back, respectively; prominent gray streaking on throat and distinct breast collar. Belly with smoky gray wash, lighter in the middle. Generally more intense coloration overall. Bill heavy.	Coastal SW California, east to Little San Bernardino Mountains, some isolated mountain ranges in W Mojave Desert, and Whale Peak (San Diego County). Southwards through N Baja California, Mexico (Sierra de Juárez, Sierra San Pedro Mártir) to Todos Santos Bay
	Aphelocoma californica cana Pitelka, 1951	Eagle Mountain scrub jay	Smaller, lighter and grayer than californica. Bill not as heavy. Apparently an isolate of hybrid origin between A. c. obscura and nevadae of the woodhouseii group.	Only occurs in single-leaf pinyon woods on Eagle Mountain, Joshua Tree National Park.
