= Lyonia Preserve =

Nature reserve in Deltona, Florida

Coordinates: 28.92°N 81.22°W

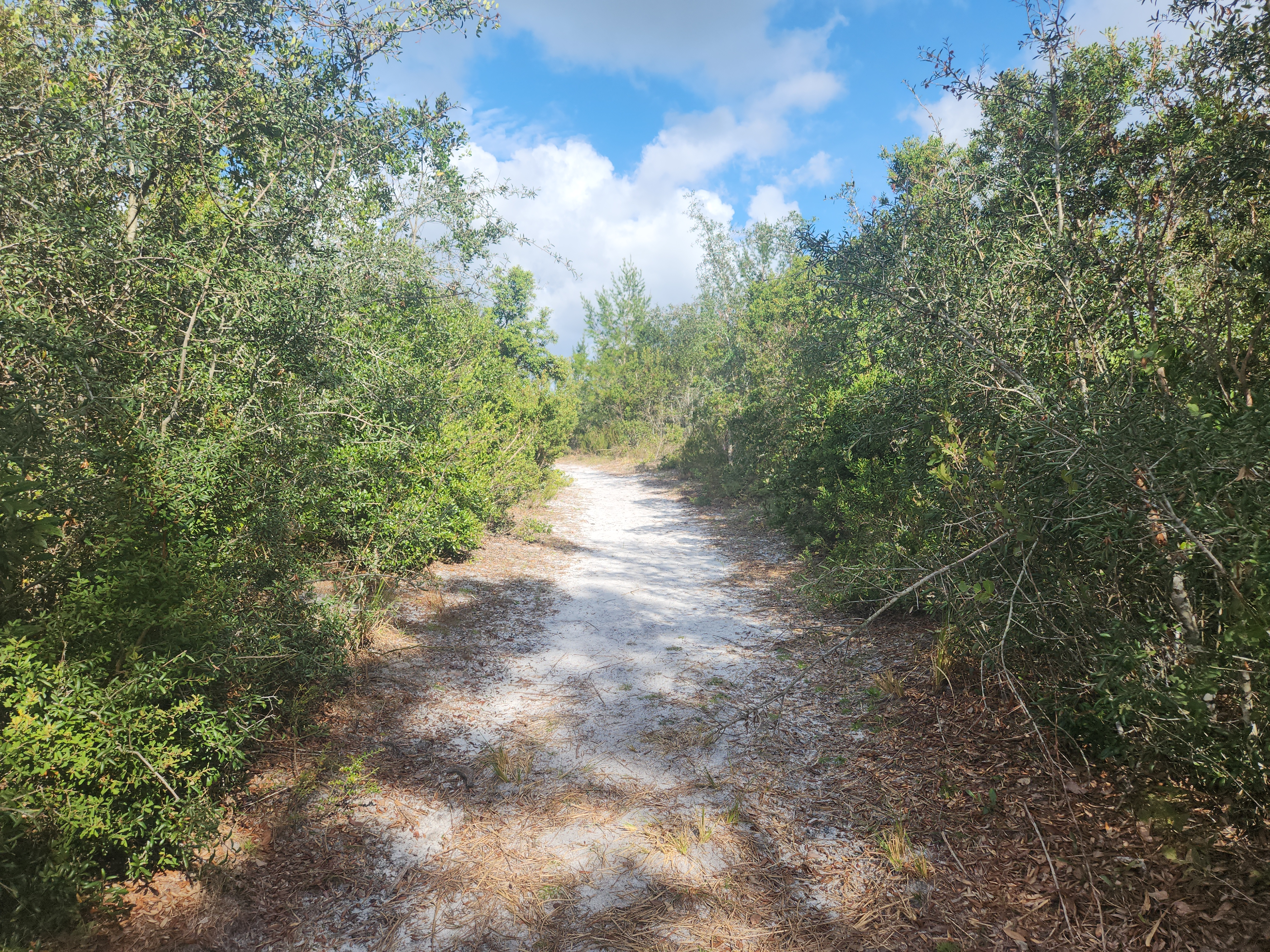
A trail located in the Lyonia Preserve.

The Lyonia Preserve is a nature reserve located in Deltona, Florida near the local library. It is joint managed by the state, Volusia County, and the Volusia County School Board. It contains scrublands and the Florida scrub jay, both of which are damaged in the state. The preserve's goal is to maintain the scrublands and the animals on it like the gopher tortoise and the Florida scrub jay.

== History ==
When Congress set up townships in the United States in 1785, section 16 of the township was to be set up for education. When Deltona was developing, a shopping center was proposed in the 1990s where the Lyonia Preserve would be. Volusia County School Board decided that the land would be used for education and environmental preservation, both receiving 240 acres (0.97 km^{2}) and 360 acres (1.5 km^{2}) respectively. The preserve was named after the lyonia.

== Conservation ==
Florida scrub jays do not live in suburbia and require open scrubland. While the preserve provides scrubland, the city is reluctant to do controlled burns due to its proximity to city hall and Daytona State College's Deltona campus, lowering the quality of habitat for scrub jays. The county does cut down trees to recreate natural processes; however, it does not fully mimic fire. While the trees are being cut down, trails remain open.

Each year, a group from Audubon Florida does a yearly count of the scrub jays at the preserve.

== Lyonia Environmental Center ==
The Lyonia Environmental Center is a museum and activity center to provide environmental information for the protected scrublands. The center's Discovery Room includes reptile exhibits and a 425-gallon saltwater aquarium.

== Trails ==
The preserve has three trails. Their lengths are: 0.4 miles (0.64 km), 1.2 miles (1.9 km), 2.4 miles (3.9 km). The trails are made of sand and lack shade.

== See also ==
- Environmental issues in Florida
