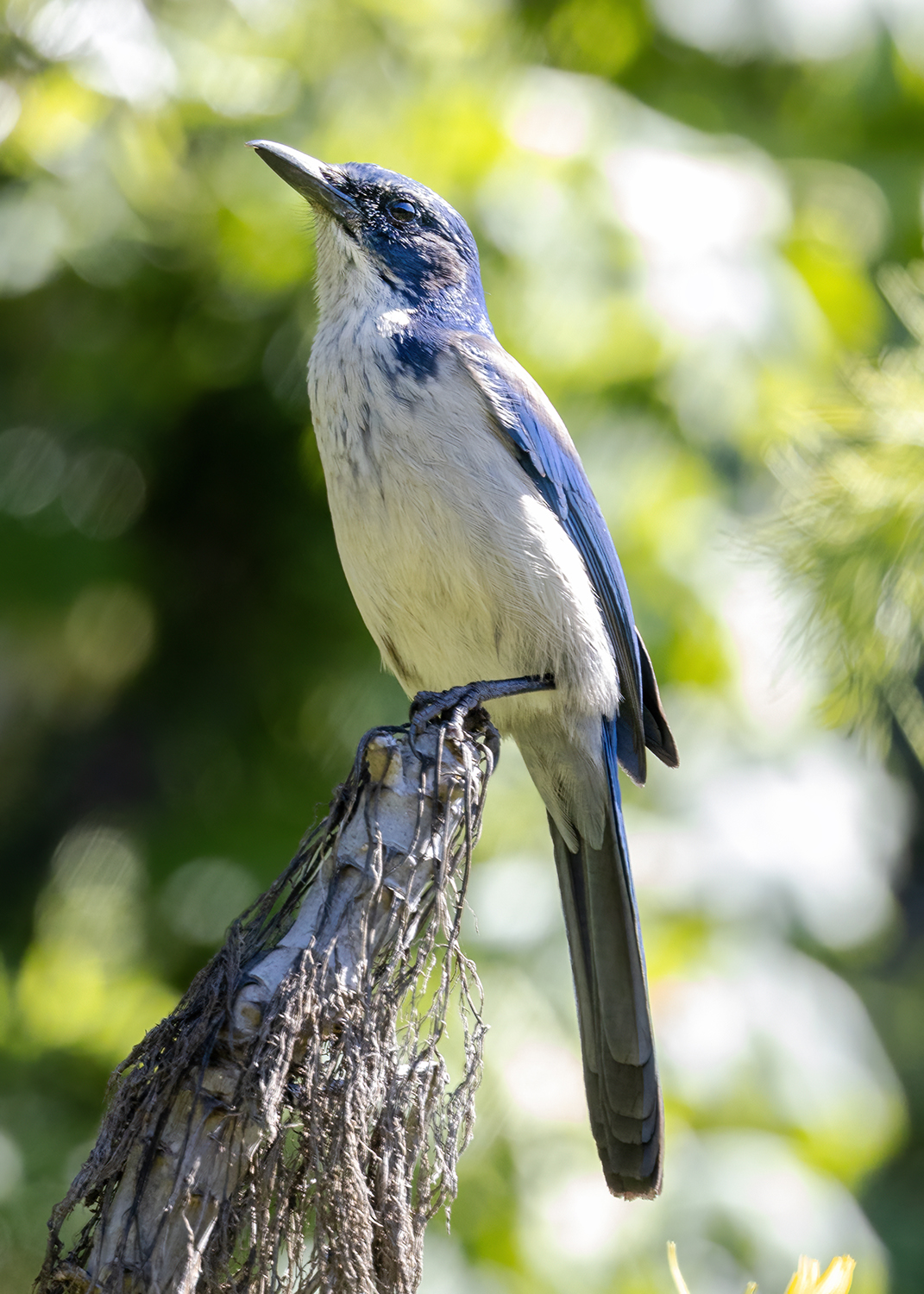
- On Santa Cruz Island, California

Conservation status
- Vulnerable (IUCN 3.1)

- Critically Imperiled (NatureServe)

Scientific classification
- Kingdom: Animalia
- Phylum: Chordata
- Class: Aves
- Order: Passeriformes
- Family: Corvidae
- Genus: Aphelocoma
- Species: A. insularis

Binomial name
- Aphelocoma insularis Henshaw, 1886
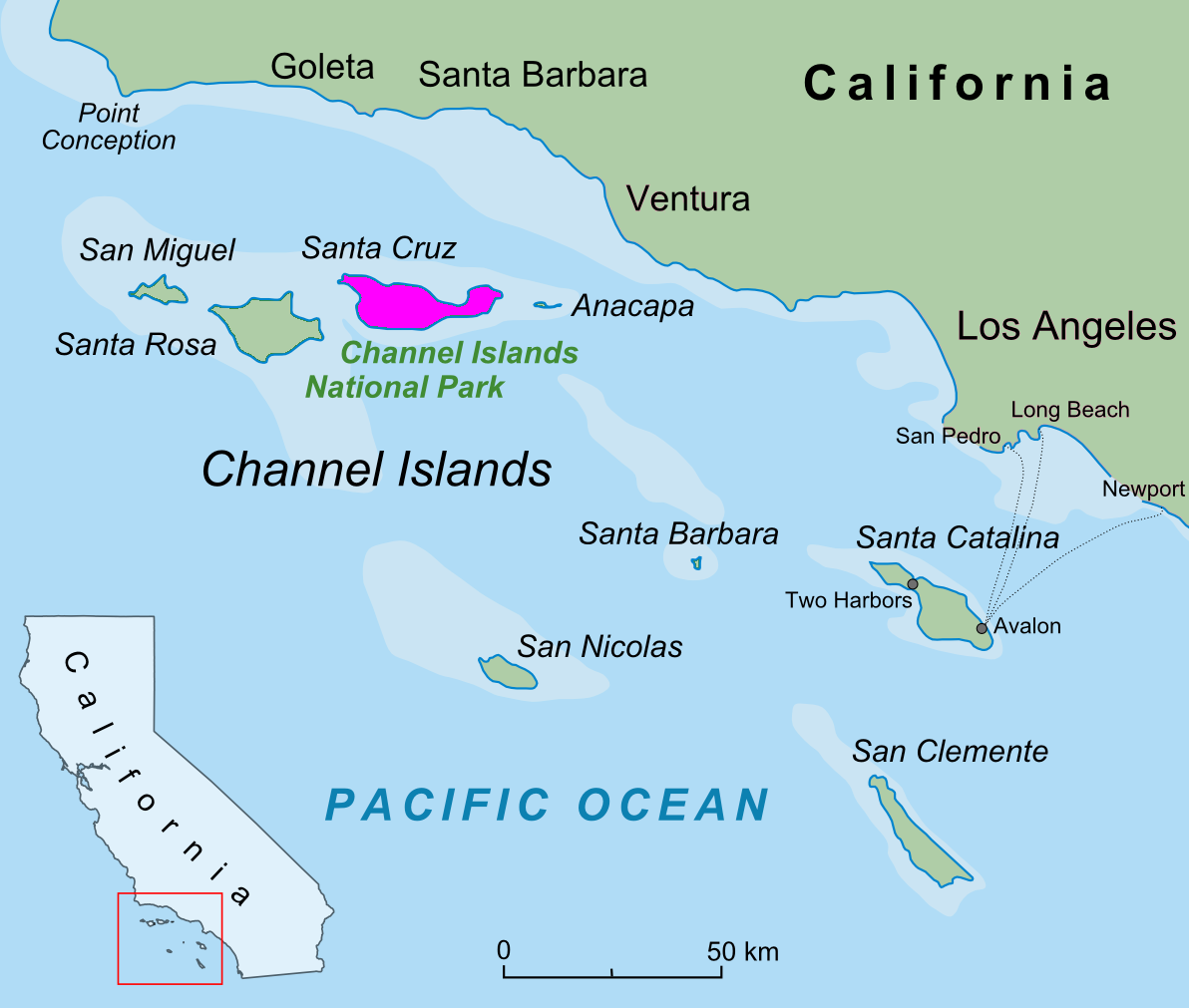
- Year-round resident range on Santa Cruz Island

= Island scrub jay =

Species of bird

The island scrub jay (Aphelocoma insularis), also known as the island jay or Santa Cruz jay, is a bird in the genus Aphelocoma, which is endemic to Santa Cruz Island off the coast of Southern California. Of the over 500 breeding bird species in the continental U.S. and Canada, it is the only insular endemic landbird species, meaning it is restricted to a geographical island.

== Description ==
The island scrub jay is closely related to the California scrub jay (the coastal population found on the adjacent mainland), but differs in being larger, more brightly colored, and having a markedly stouter bill. They will bury, or cache, the acorns in the fall and may eat them months later. They also eat insects, spiders, snakes, lizards, mice and other birds' eggs and nestlings.

== Taxonomy ==
The island scrub jay was first described by American ornithologist Henry Wetherbee Henshaw in 1886 and an archaeological specimen at site SCRI-192 dating from the 1780s-1812 on Santa Cruz Island is the earliest evidence of the bird in the historic period. This bird is a member of the crow family, and is one of a group of closely related North American species named as scrub jays. These were formerly treated as a single species, the scrub jay (as Aphelocoma coerulescens), with five subspecies, but are now considered four species: the Florida scrub jay (A. coerulescens), the island scrub jay, the California scrub jay (A. californica), and Woodhouse's scrub jay (A. woodhouseii). DNA studies indicate that the island and coastal forms have long been isolated from their relatives inland. The relationships within the genus have been studied in several papers (e.g.)

Island scrub jays seem to be incapable of crossing to the mainland. However they were once present on three of California's northern Channel Islands, San Miguel Island, Santa Rosa Island, and Santa Cruz Island where they persist today. Reliable historical observer records for island scrub jays in addition to Santa Cruz Island include only a single 1892 account on neighboring Santa Rosa Island, only about 10 km (6 mi) away. The historic observation on Santa Rosa Island is supported by a Pleistocene archaeological record of a single island scrub jay femur from a Late Pleistocene-Holocene site (SRI-V-3) found by Paul Collins of the Santa Barbara Museum of Natural History. There are also two Late Holocene archaeological remains found in San Miguel Island cave sites. There are no definite occurrences of any scrub jay on any other of the Channel Islands, or on the Coronado Islands, only 13 km (8.1 mi) from the mainland.

Early studies suggested that the ancestor of the present population was storm-borne or carried on driftwood to Santa Cruz, or that the colonization occurred during a period of glaciation 70,000 to 10,000 years ago, when sea levels were much lower and the channel between the coast and the islands was correspondingly narrower. More recent DNA studies show that, although other island endemics such as the island fox and the Santa Cruz mouse may have diverged from their mainland relatives around 10,000 years ago, the scrub jays separated in a period of glaciation around 151,000 years ago. The most recent analysis indicates that the island scrub jay has been evolving in isolation for approximately one million years, i.e. over multiple glacial cycles. Up to about 11,000 years ago, the four northern Channel Islands were one large island, so island scrub jays must have been present on all four islands initially, but became extinct on Santa Rosa, San Miguel and Anacapa after they were separated by rising sea levels.

Despite being confined to a small island of 96 square miles, island scrub jays display significant physical and genetic variation. Jays in oak-dominated habitat have shorter, deeper bills than those in pine-dominated habitat, even when those habitats are separated by only a few kilometers. This difference is reflected in the two populations' genetics. Females with different bill types also tend to have different calls, suggesting that these bill types may be based on mate choice rather than simple chance.

== Distribution and habitat ==
The island scrub jay is found today only on Santa Cruz Island, the largest of California's Channel Islands with an area of 250 km^{2} (96 mi^{2}). The island is a nature reserve, the eastern 24% being administered by National Park Service as the part of the Channel Islands National Park and the rest of the island by the Nature Conservancy. Fossil remains for island scrub jays have been found on Santa Rosa and San Miguel Islands.

Island scrub jays occur in oak chaparral and bishop pine (Pinus muricata) woodland on Santa Cruz Island. Island scrub jays in pine habitat have longer, shallower bills than individuals in oak habitat; variation in bill shape is heritable, and individuals mate nonrandomly with respect to bill morphology.

== Breeding ==
Females lay 3 to 5 eggs. Incubation lasts approximately 20 days. These jays are generally monogamous and, unlike some other jays, are not cooperative breeders. Both sexes build a nest 1 m (3 ft) to 8 m (26 ft) above the ground. Further details in.

== Etymology ==
The genus name, Aphelocoma, comes from the Latinized Ancient Greek apheles- (from ἀφελής-) "simple" + Latin coma (from Greek kome κόμη) "hair", in reference to the lack of striped or banded feathers in this genus, compared to other jays. The species name, insularis, comes from the Latin for "from an island".

== Conservation status ==
The island scrub jay is classed as vulnerable on the IUCN Red List because its small range makes it potentially vulnerable to a catastrophic incident such as disease or a large fire that destroys their habitat. Population size in 2008 and 2009 was estimated to be 1700 – 2300, making this one of the rarest songbird species in the United States. The entire range of island scrub jays is currently protected in Channel Islands National Park and the species is not at imminent risk of extinction. However, the establishment of West Nile virus (WNV) in southern California in 2003 may pose a threat if it crosses to Santa Cruz Island from the mainland. Corvids are especially vulnerable to WNV. In addition, the increased occurrence of wildfires in southern California may portend a catastrophic fire there. Shrub cover has increased since the removal of sheep (1980–91) and feral pigs (2005–07) from Santa Cruz Island, which may increase the fire risk. Overgrazing by non-native ungulates may have caused extirpation of island scrub jays on Santa Rosa Island. Re-establishing a second population of island scrub jays on Santa Rosa Island and San Miguel Island may accelerate the restoration of native plant and tree species because of the scatter-hoarding seed caching behavior of Aphelocoma species.

== Human interaction and uses ==
The Chumash people who were the original inhabitants of the northern Channel Islands may have eaten the local scrub jay, or used its feathers for decoration, since they are known to have made feather bands including jay feathers on the Californian mainland. Human activities may have contributed to the presumed extinction of the island scrub jay from the smaller islands.
