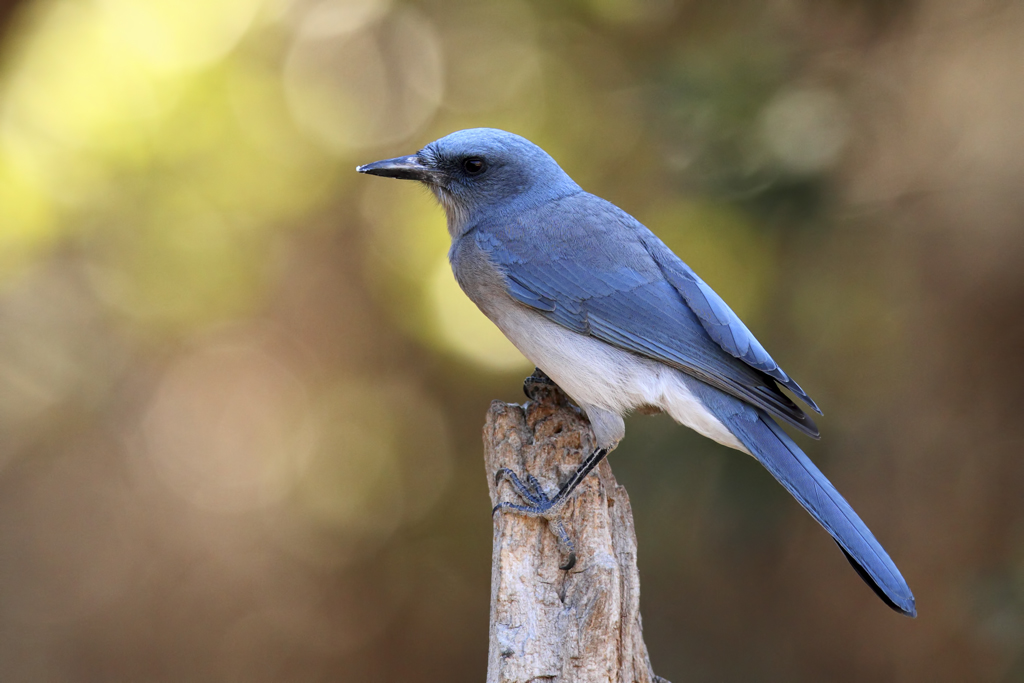
- Mexican jay from Madera Canyon, Arizona, Aphelocoma wollweberi arizonae. note bill color not entirely black, this is a character of the Arizona race

Conservation status
- Least Concern (IUCN 3.1)

Scientific classification
- Kingdom: Animalia
- Phylum: Chordata
- Class: Aves
- Order: Passeriformes
- Family: Corvidae
- Genus: Aphelocoma
- Species: A. wollweberi

Binomial name
- Aphelocoma wollweberi Kaup, 1855

Subspecies
- 5, see text

= Mexican jay =

Species of bird

The Mexican jay (Aphelocoma wollweberi) formerly known as the gray-breasted jay, is a New World jay native to the Sierra Madre Oriental, Sierra Madre Occidental, and Central Plateau of Mexico and parts of the southwestern United States. In May 2011, the American Ornithologists' Union voted to split the Mexican jay into two species, one retaining the common name Mexican jay and one called the Transvolcanic jay. The Mexican jay is a medium-sized jay with blue upper parts and pale gray underparts. It resembles the Woodhouse's scrub-jay, but has an unstreaked throat and breast. It feeds largely on acorns and pine nuts, but includes many other plant and animal foods in its diet. It has a cooperative breeding system where the parents are assisted by other birds to raise their young. This is a common species with a wide range and the International Union for Conservation of Nature has rated its conservation status as being of "least concern".

== Taxonomy and systematics ==
A recent decision by the American Ornithologists' Union Check-list Committee elevated some populations of the Mexican jay to a separate species, called the Transvolcanic jay (A. ultramarina), based on diagnosable phenotypic differences in plumage and morphology, millions of years of genetic divergence and no evidence for interbreeding with Mexican jays. The Transvolcanic jay inhabits montane forest in the Transvolcanic Belt of central Mexico. Populations to the north retained the common name Mexican jay, but the Latin name changed to A. wollweberi. This was because the type specimen was a Transvolcanic jay, meaning that this species had precedent for the original Latin name A. ultramarina.

Thus, as of this decision, there are now five described subspecies of the Mexican jay that are divided into three divergent groups (see below). Marked differences in size, color, vocalizations, and genetics have led some authors to consider at least two of these groups as separate species (Eastern and Western; Navarro-Sigüenza and Peterson 2004). The three groups inhabit three distinct mountainous regions in northern and central Mexico. Genetic breaks in mitochondrial and microsatellite DNA occur abruptly between the groups, indicating some barriers to genetic exchange (McCormack et al. 2008). Size variation among the groups does not always follow Bergmann's rule, with more southerly populations in the Sierra Madre Oriental being larger than populations to the north. Mexican jays do not seem to follow Gloger's rule either, as populations in arid habitat in southwestern Texas are very blue. On the other hand, Mexican jays in Arizona - also arid habitat - have a washed-out appearance, in accordance with Gloger's rule.

Western group
Sierra Madre Occidental in northern [Jalisco] north to central Arizona and southwestern New Mexico. Southern and eastern limits in Jalisco deserve further study. Juveniles have a pink/pale base to the otherwise black bill for up to two years. Eggs are pale green-blue and unspeckled, unlike Eastern group where speckled eggs are common.

- Aphelocoma wollweberi gracilis

Eastern Nayarit and northern Jalisco
Smallest of the Western subspecies with a distinct, high-pitched vocalization.

- Aphelocoma wollweberi wollweberi

Durango and Zacatecas
Intermediate in size.

- Aphelocoma wollweberi arizonae

Sonora and Chihuahua north to Arizona and New Mexico, United States
Largest and palest of all the subspecies.

Eastern group
Sierra Madre Oriental in Nuevo León and western Tamaulipas north to Texas (Chisos Mountains). Juveniles have an all-black exterior to the bill after fledging, but roof of inner upper mandible can remain partially white for up to two years. Reports of less social behavior compared to other groups are over-stated and credible accounts of cooperative breeding (Ligon and Husar 1974) and large flock sizes (Bhagabati and Horvath 2006) exist. Plain, speckled, and even white eggs have been observed in a single study area (McCormack and Berg 2010).

- Aphelocoma wollweberi couchii

Smaller than preceding. Population of the latter subspecies distinguishable by more contrasting markings and ecological preferences (lowland birds). Egg color may range from plain blue to Nile blue with pale brownish speckling, most heavy on blunt half. Gives rattle call similar to Cyanocitta and other Aphelocoma jays.

Central Plateau group
Central Plateau in Queretaro, Guanajuato, San Luis Potosi, and eastern Jalisco. Similar to Eastern group but larger in most features. Distinguishable in morphology and plumage in ~80% of specimens. There is an area of apparent hybridization in San Luis Potosi that deserves study.

- Aphelocoma wollweberi potosina

== Description ==
The Mexican jay is a medium-large (~120 g) passerine similar in size to most other jays, with a blue head, blue-gray mantle, blue wings and tail, and pale gray breast and underparts. The sexes are morphologically similar, and juveniles differ only in having less blue coloration and, in some populations, a pink/pale (instead of black) bill that progressively becomes more black with age (Brown and Horvath 1989). Some field guides misreport this color as yellow because the pale bill becomes yellow in museum study skins. The iris is brown and legs are black. It is most readily distinguished from the similar Woodhouse's scrub-jay by the plain (unstreaked) throat and breast, and the mantle contrasting less with the head and wings. Its range somewhat overlaps with the Woodhouse's scrub-jay, but, where they co-occur, the two species seem to show ecological and morphological character displacement (Curry et al. 2002).

== Distribution and habitat ==
It is native to the Sierra Madre Oriental, Sierra Madre Occidental, and Central Plateau of Mexico as well as eastern Arizona, western New Mexico and western Texas in the United States. Its preferred habitat is montane pine-oak forest.

== Ecology ==
In the winter, the Mexican jay's diet consists mainly of acorns and pine nuts, which are stored in the autumn. However, they are omnivorous in all seasons and their diet includes a wide variety of plant and animal matter, including invertebrates, small amphibians and reptiles, and birds' eggs and nestlings (McCormack and Brown 2008).

It has a cooperative breeding system similar to that of the related Florida scrub-jay, with several birds helping at a nest; these "helpers" are usually immature offspring of the dominant pair from the previous 1–2 years, but also include apparently unrelated flock members.
