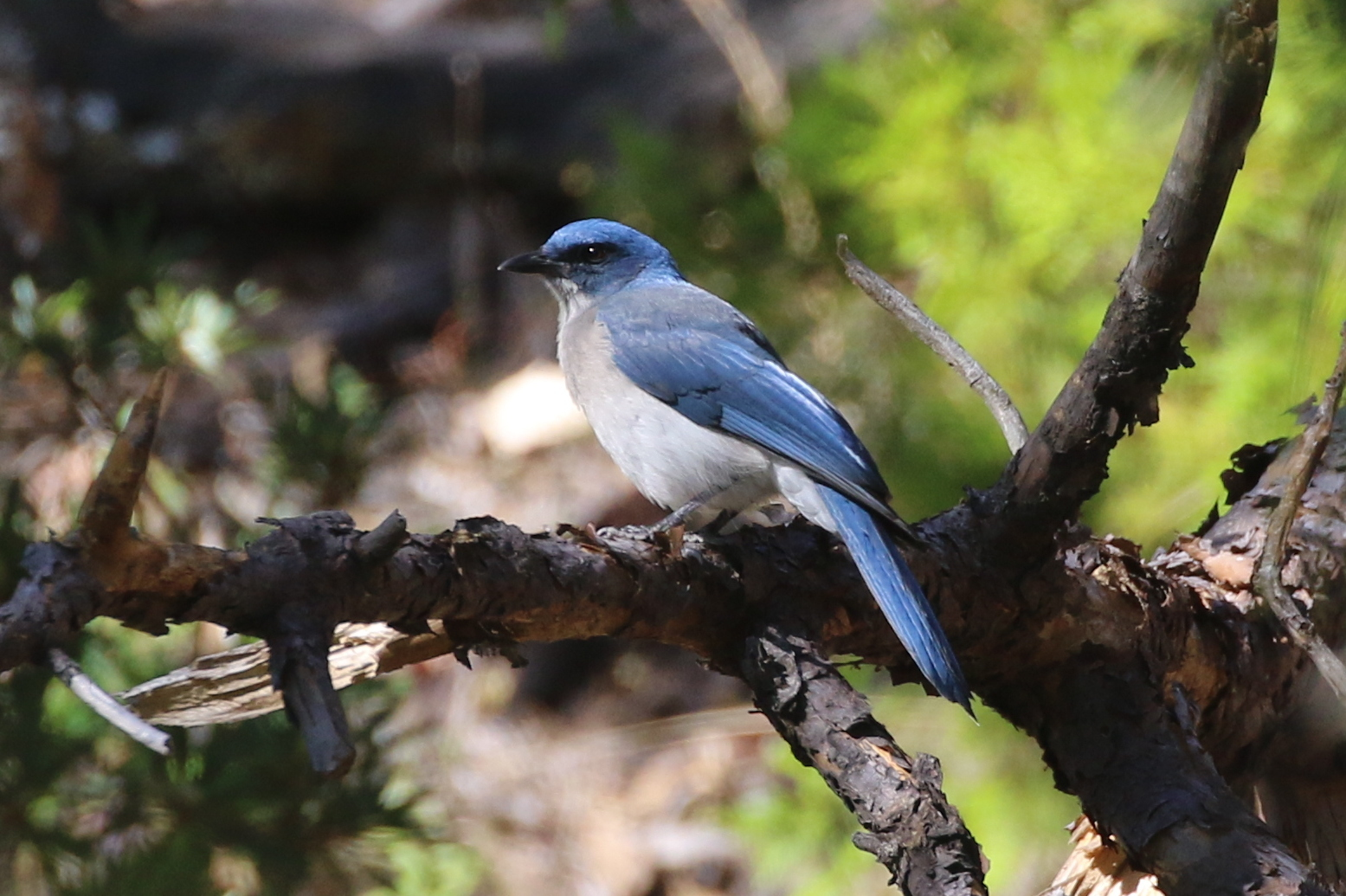
- Near San Sebastián del Oeste, Jalisco, Mexico

Conservation status
- Least Concern (IUCN 3.1)

Scientific classification
- Kingdom: Animalia
- Phylum: Chordata
- Class: Aves
- Order: Passeriformes
- Family: Corvidae
- Genus: Aphelocoma
- Species: A. ultramarina

Binomial name
- Aphelocoma ultramarina (Bonaparte, 1825)

= Transvolcanic jay =

Species of bird

The Transvolcanic jay (Aphelocoma ultramarina), is a species of bird in the family Corvidae, the crows and jays. It is endemic to Mexico.

== Taxonomy and systematics ==
What is now the species Aphelocoma ultramarina was originally described in 1825 as Corvus ultramarinus. It was long called the Mexican jay and included what are now the several subspecies of Aphelocoma wollweberi. Taxonomic systems began separating them in 2011 based on differences in plumage and morphology, millions of years of genetic divergence, and no evidence of interbreeding. Aphelocoma ultramarina was then named the Transvolcanic jay and confusingly Aphelocoma wollweberi retained the name Mexican jay.

The Transvolcanic jay has two subspecies, the nominate A. u. ultramaria (Bonaparte, 1825) and A. u. colimae (Nelson, 1899).

== Description ==
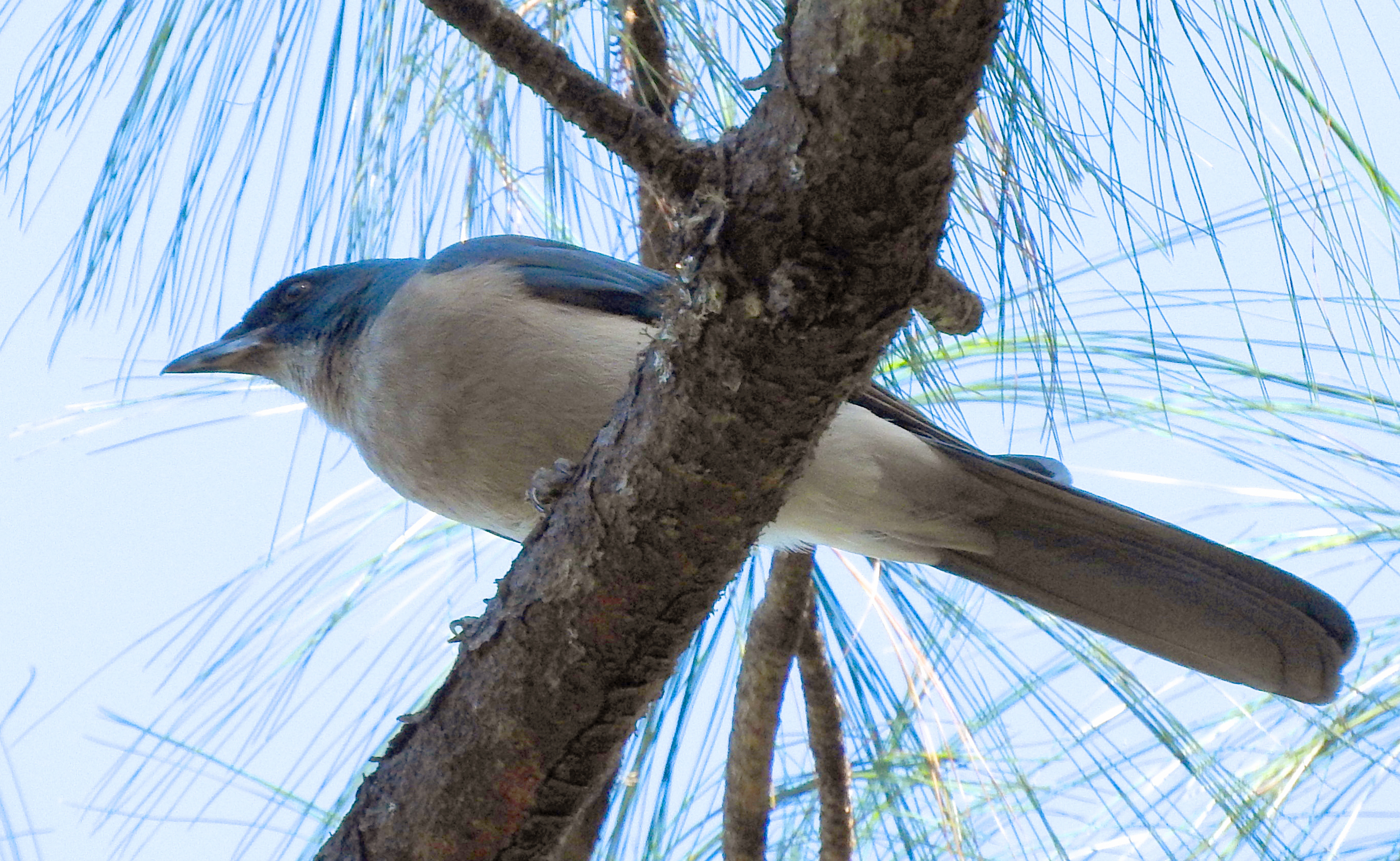
In San Sebastián de Oeste, Jalisco, Mexico

The Transvolcanic jay is 28 to 32 cm (11 to 13 in) long and weighs 120 to 150 g (4.2 to 5.3 oz). The sexes have the same plumage though males are slightly larger than females. Adults of the nominate subspecies have a mostly dark bluish head with black lores and a pale grayish throat. Their upperparts are bluish purple and their underparts dingy grayish white that is lightest on the undertail coverts. Subspecies A. u. colimae is slightly smaller than the nominate and paler overall with less purplish on its upperparts. Both subspecies have a brown iris, a heavy, pointed black bill, and black legs and feet. Juveniles have mouse-gray upperparts with a slight blue wash, a gray to blue-green tail, grayer wings with dark brown feather ends, and a pale bill.

== Distribution and habitat ==
The Transvolcanic jay derives its name from its range in the Transvolcanic Belt of south-central Mexico. Subspecies A. u. colimae is the more westerly of the two and has the smaller range. It is found in Jalisco and northeastern Colima. The nominate subspecies is found from southeastern Jalisco and northwestern Michoacán east to Veracruz. It inhabits montane pine and pine-oak forest in the subtropical zone. In elevation it ranges between about 900 and 3,400 m (3,000 and 11,200 ft).

== Behavior ==
=== Movement ===
The Transvolcanic jay is a year-round resident.

=== Feeding ===
The Transvolcanic jay's diet is not known in detail but apparently is mostly the seeds of pines and oaks. It probably also eats fruits, invertebrates, and small vertebrates. It lives in flocks of up to about 20 individuals that maintain a territory. It forages on the ground, in shrubs, and in trees and caches and recovers food throughout the year.

=== Breeding ===
Nothing is known about the Transvolcanic jay's breeding biology. It is assumed to be similar to that of the Mexican jay, which see here.

=== Vocalization ===
The Transvolcanic jay's voice is very similar to that of the Mexican jay, and is described as "an upslurred grating call note, repeated singly, doubled or in series". The grating appears to decrease from the beginning to the end of each note.

== Status ==
The IUCN has assessed the Transvolcanic jay as being of Least Concern. It has a very large range; its estimated population of at least 50,000 mature individuals is believed to be decreasing. No immediate threats have been identified. It is considered fairly common though "colimae [is] at risk because its small range is undergoing extensive habitat clearance for agriculture and timber".
