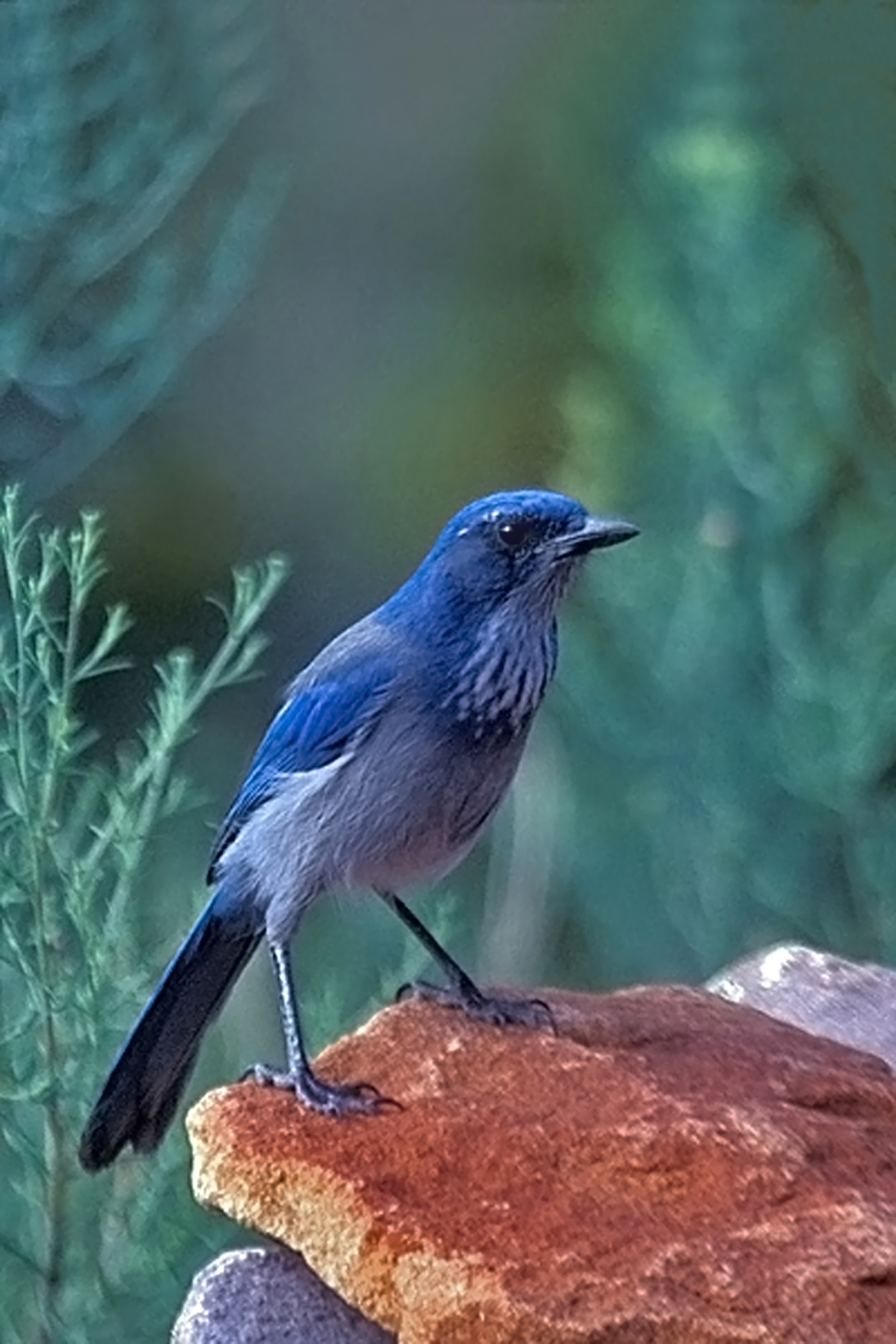
- In Santa Fe, New Mexico

Conservation status
- Least Concern (IUCN 3.1)

Scientific classification
- Kingdom: Animalia
- Phylum: Chordata
- Class: Aves
- Order: Passeriformes
- Family: Corvidae
- Genus: Aphelocoma
- Species: A. woodhouseii

Binomial name
- Aphelocoma woodhouseii (S.F. Baird, 1858)

Subspecies
- See text

= Woodhouse's scrub jay =

Species of bird

Woodhouse's scrub jay (Aphelocoma^{[a]} woodhouseii) is a species of scrub jay native to western North America, ranging from southeastern Oregon and southern Idaho to central Mexico. Woodhouse's scrub jay was until recently considered the same species as the California scrub jay, and collectively called the western scrub jay. Prior to that both of them were also considered the same species as the island scrub jay and the Florida scrub jay; the taxon was then called simply the scrub jay. Woodhouse's scrub jay is nonmigratory and can be found in urban areas, where it can become tame and will come to bird feeders. While many refer to scrub jays as "blue jays", the blue jay is a different species of bird entirely. Woodhouse's scrub jay is named for the American naturalist and explorer Samuel Washington Woodhouse.

== Description ==
Woodhouse's scrub jay is a medium-sized bird, approximately 27–31 cm (11–12 in) in length (including its tail), with a 39 cm (15 in) wingspan, and about 80 g (2.8 oz) in weight. The species has a blue head, wings, and tail; a gray-brown back; and grayish underparts. The throat is whitish with a partial blue breast band ("necklace"). The call is described as "harsh and scratchy". Compared to the California scrub jay, Woodhouse's has a duller blue, darker gray underparts, a less distinct blue necklace, and a straighter bill.

== Habitat ==
True to its name, Woodhouse's scrub jay inhabits areas of low scrub, preferring pinon-juniper forests, oak woods, edges of mixed evergreen forests, and sometimes mesquite bosques. Woodhouse's scrub jays are very common west of the southern Rocky Mountains, and can be found in scrub-brush, boreal forests, and temperate forests.

=== Foraging ===
Woodhouse's scrub jays usually forage in pairs, family groups, or small non-kin groups, outside of the breeding season. They feed on small animals, such as frogs and lizards, eggs and young of other birds, insects, and (particularly in winter) grains, nuts, and berries. They can be aggressive towards other birds, for example, they have been known to steal hoarded acorns from Acorn Woodpecker granary trees.

=== Food storing ===
Woodhouse's scrub jays, like many other corvids, exploit ephemeral surpluses by storing food in scattered caches within their territories. They rely on highly accurate and complex memories to recover the hidden caches, often after long periods of time. In the process of collecting and storing this food, they have shown an ability to plan ahead in choosing cache sites to provide adequate food volume and variety for the future. Woodhouse's scrub jays are also able to rely on their accurate observational spatial memories to steal food from caches made by conspecifics. To protect their caches from potential 'pilferers', food storing birds implement a number of strategies to reduce this risk of theft. Western scrub jays are also known for hoarding and burying brightly colored objects. Woodhouse's scrub jays have a mischievous streak, and they are not above outright theft. They have been caught stealing acorns from acorn woodpecker caches and robbing seeds and pine cones from Clark's nutcrackers. Some scrub jays steal acorns they have watched other jays hide. When these birds go to hide their own acorns, they check first that no other jays are watching. Western scrub jays sometimes land on the backs of mule deer to eat ticks and other parasites present on the deer. The deer seem to appreciate the help, often standing still and holding up their ears to give the jays access. The scrub jay even will eat peanuts off a human hand.

=== Intelligence ===
Recent research has suggested that Woodhouse's scrub jays, along with several other corvids, are among the most intelligent of animals. The brain-to-body mass ratio of adult scrub jays rivals that of chimpanzees and cetaceans, and is dwarfed only by that of humans. Scrub jays are also the only non-primate or non-dolphin shown to plan ahead for the future, which was previously thought of as a uniquely human trait. Other studies have shown that they can remember locations of over 200 food caches, as well as the food item in each cache and its rate of decay. To protect their caches from pilfering conspecifics, scrub jays will choose locations out-of-sight of their competitors, or re-cache caches once they are alone, suggesting that they can take into account the perspective of others.

=== Nesting ===
The chicks start off fully gray. The older they get, the more they turn blue. On their heads, chicks tend to have a red crest that resembles a comb (Mostly seen on chickens). The chick will lose its crest at day seven, just like the way the baby chickens lose their egg tooth at 5–7 days. Nests are built low in trees or bushes, 1–10 m (3.3–32.8 ft) above the ground, primarily by the female, while the male guards her efforts. The nests are sturdy, with an outside diameter of 33–58 cm (13–23 in), constructed on a platform of twigs with moss and dry grasses lined with fine roots and hair. Four to six eggs are laid from March through July, with some regional variations. There are two common shell color variations: pale green with irregular, olive-colored spots or markings; and pale grayish-white to green with reddish-brown spots. The female incubates the eggs for about 16 days. The young leave the nest about 18 days after hatching.

== Life span ==
The life span of wild Woodhouse's scrub jays is approximately 9 years.

== Diseases ==
Populations are being adversely affected by the West Nile virus.

== Phylogeny ==
The Woodhouse's, California, island, and Florida scrub jay were once considered subspecies of a single "scrub jay" species. They are now believed to be distinct. Beyond the close relationship of the "California" and island scrub jays, resolution of their evolutionary history has proven very difficult. Judging from mtDNA NADH dehydrogenase subunit 2 sequence data, there are two clades, namely a Pacific one west and one east of the Rocky Mountains.

Woodhouse's scrub jay differs in plumage (paler blue above, with an indistinct and usually incomplete breast band) from the California scrub jay, which are darker blue above with a strongly defined–but not necessarily complete–blue breast band.

A subgroup of Woodhouse's scrub jay living in interior southern Mexico is sometimes called Sumichrast's scrub jay.

The subspecies are:

=== Woodhouse's scrub jay, Aphelocoma (woodhouseii) woodhouseii ===
- Aphelocoma woodhouseii nevadae Pitelka, 1945a – Nevada scrub jay

Great Basin from N Nevada southwards, some isolated mountain ranges in Death Valley and Mojave Desert from E California to the SW of New Mexico, south to NE Sonora and extreme NW Chihuahua. Some hybridization with A. w. oocleptica (californica group) at the north-western edge of its range.
Lighter and duller than woodhouseii; light blue undertail coverts. Bill longish, quite pointed, and tapering, not hooked at tip.

- Aphelocoma woodhouseii woodhouseii (Baird, 1858) - Woodhouse's scrub jay

Rocky Mountains foothills, from N Utah/S Wyoming south through NW Chihuahua and W Texas, sometimes ranging farther into that state.
Blue of neck with dull grayish hue; back grayish brown. Undertail coverts blue. Bill heavy but straight, hardly hooked at tip.

- Aphelocoma woodhouseii texana Ridgway, 1902 – Texas scrub jay

Hitherto only known from Edwards Plateau (Texas); area and extent of possible contact with woodhouseii undetermined. Possibly this subspecies at Caprock Escarpment, where species settled in the 1950s.
Darker than woodhouseii with hint of breast collar. Lower breast with brownish hue, large white patch on lower belly. Undertail coverts white; in adult males usually with some blue feather tips. Back quite brown. Young birds conspicuously paler than in woodhouseii. Heavy, fairly blunt bill.

- Aphelocoma woodhouseii grisea Nelson, 1899

Sierra Madre Occidental, primarily in Chihuahua; intergrading with nevadae at NW of range.
Lighter and larger than woodhouseii, with a hint of a blue collar. Undertail coverts white. Long wings and fairly short, heavy bill.

- Aphelocoma woodhouseii cyanotis Ridgway, 1887 – Blue-eared scrub jay

Lower Sierra Madre Oriental, Mexico, from S Coahuila to Tlaxcala; generally separated from texana woodhouseii; range adjacent to grisea in S Chihuahuan Desert. Apparently replaced by Mexican jay at higher-altitude woodland towards S of range.
Larger and duller than woodhouseii. Back brown with blue tinge, sometimes quite bluish. Supercilium faint and small. Underside quite light; lower belly white. Undertail coverts dull white. Bill and wings as in grisea, young birds browner than texana.

=== Sumichrast's scrub jay, Aphelocoma (woodhouseii) sumichrasti ===
- Aphelocoma woodhouseii/sumichrasti sumichrasti (Baird and Ridgway, 1874) – Sumichrast's scrub jay

From Distrito Federal southeastwards through Veracruz, Puebla, and Oaxaca.
Bright blue head color, with blackish ear patches. Faint white supercilium. Back grayish-brown, blue towards the tail. Light gray streaks on throat; traces of a faint grayish or grayish-blue breast collar. Thighs smoky gray. Remiges and rectrices dark dull blue. Large, with very long wings. Heavy, slightly hooked bill.

- Aphelocoma woodhouseii/sumichrasti remota Griscom, 1934 – Chilpancingo scrub jay

SW Oaxaca and central Guerrero. Apparently separated from sumichrasti by Rio Balsas valley.
Duller and lighter than sumichrasti. Largest of all western scrub jays.

The common name of this subspecies commemorates the Mexican naturalist Francis Sumichrast.

== Footnotes ==
^{a} Etymology: Aphelocoma, from Latinized Ancient Greek apheles- (from ἀφελής-) "simple" + Latin coma (from Greek kome κόμη) "hair", in reference to the lack of striped or banded feathers in this genus compared to other jays.
