= Tampa Bay Library Consortium =

Central and West Florida library cooperative

Tampa Bay Library Consortium (TBLC), with headquarters in Tampa, Florida, is a nonprofit library cooperative that assists hundreds of libraries in the Central and West Florida regions. TBLC serves public libraries, academic libraries, school libraries and special libraries. The TBLC membership serves 6.3 million people in the State of Florida.

== Mission statement ==
The mission statement for the TBLC is, "the TBLC is a community of libraries and the people who work in them committed to collaboration and bettering Floridians’ lives through continuously improving library services. TBLC supports this community’s success by providing essential services, connecting staff through active engagement, and creating an environment of continuous learning and innovation."

== History ==
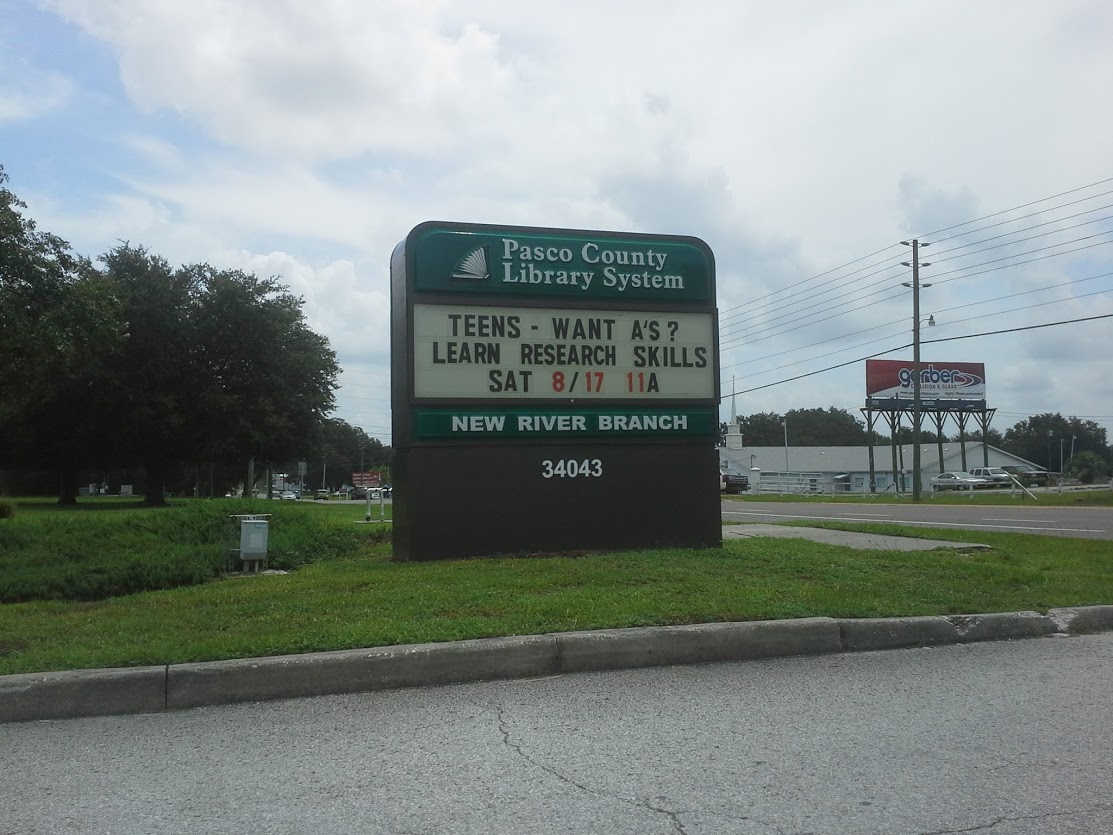
Marquee for the New River Library, a branch of the Pasco County Library Cooperative, a member of TBLC.

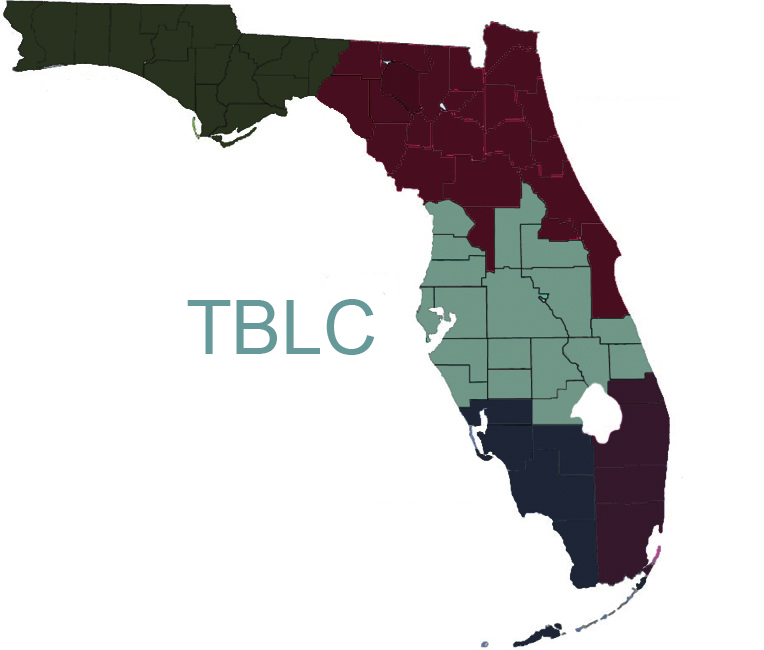
Map of the TBLC member area in Florida serving over 6.3 million patrons.

TBLC was established in 1979. There are five multi-type library cooperatives throughout Florida serving all types of libraries (academic, public, special, and school). The other cooperatives are NEFLIN, PLAN, SEFLIN, and SWFLN.

== Staff and board of directors ==
TBLC is headquartered in Tampa, Florida. It operates with full-time and part-time staff members. TBLC is administered by an executive director and an executive board with 13 members. Board members are elected from member libraries.

== Membership ==
TBLC serves over 100 members in 18 Florida counties. These counties include: Citrus, Desoto, Glades, Hardee, Hernando, Highlands, Hillsborough, Indian River, Lake, Manatee, Okeechobee, Orange, Osceola, Pasco, Pinellas, Polk, Sarasota, and Saint Lucie. TBLC membership includes academic libraries, special libraries, public libraries and school libraries. "

Member libraries can be viewed on their website

== Services ==
The TBLC does not serve patrons directly. Instead, it provides services to member libraries that help them serve their patrons in a manner that is more creative, efficient, and more economically responsible than if the members were to operate individually. In 2005, TBLC offered a group purchase opportunity for member libraries and these libraries became some of the first in Florida to offer downloadable audio books to users. TBLC operates the Ask a Librarian program which answers an average of 65,000 questions a year. Other services include continuing education, interlibrary loan material delivery, video production, and e-book purchasing.

== Programs ==
Training & Workshops: TBLC offers training to its members through webinars and in-person workshops, blended learning courses and conference-style events with a regional focus on continuing education for its members.

Florida Delivery Service: Library members of FLIN are eligible to be a part of the Florida Library Delivery Service. Florida Delivery Service picks up and delivers interlibrary loan materials among 200 libraries throughout Florida.

Florida Library Webinars: TBLC gives training to staff who works in Florida libraries in the belief of a well trained staff will serve its community to the fullest.

Ask A Librarian: TBLC provides virtual reference service to Florida residents via chat and text messaging. This service began in 2003 and evolved to be a main stay and vital service for many Florida libraries.
