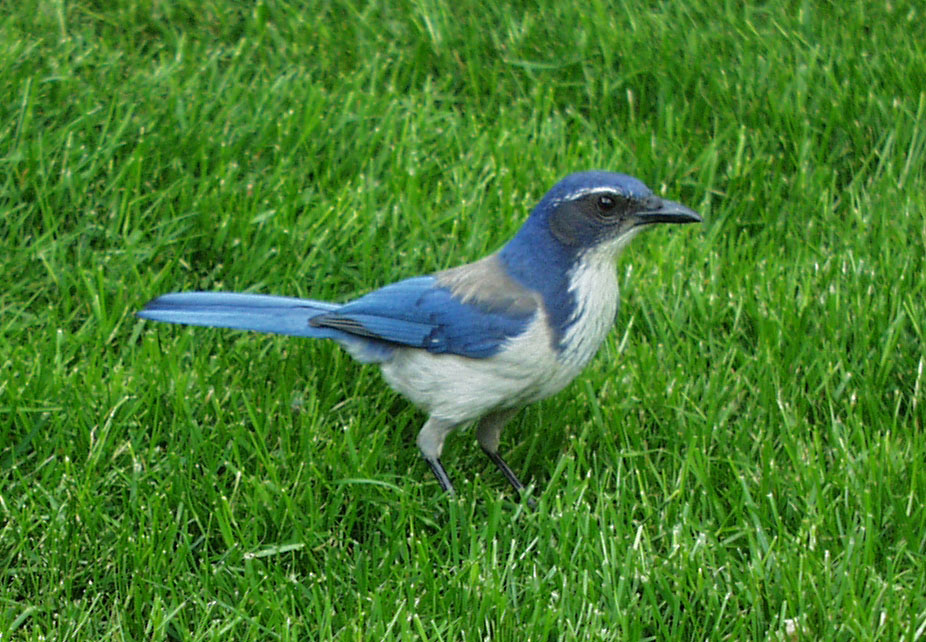
- A California scrub jay (Aphelocoma californica)

Scientific classification
- Kingdom: Animalia
- Phylum: Chordata
- Class: Aves
- Order: Passeriformes
- Family: Corvidae
- Subfamily: Cyanocoracinae
- Genus: Aphelocoma; Cabanis, 1851

Type species
- Garrulus californicus Vigors, 1839

Species
- 7, see text

= Aphelocoma =

Genus of birds

Aphelocoma is a genus of passerine birds in the family Corvidae that includes the scrub jays and their relatives. They are New World jays found in Mexico, western Central America and the western United States, with an outlying population in Florida. This genus belongs to the group of New World jays which is not closely related to other jays, magpies or treepies. Within this group, according to a 2023 molecular analysis, Aphelocoma is the sister group to a clade consisting of Cyanocitta and Gymnorhinus. They live in open pine-oak forests, chaparral, and mixed evergreen forests.

== Taxonomy ==
The genus Aphelocoma was introduced in 1851 by the German ornithologist Jean Cabanis. He placed four species in his new genus but did not specify the type. In 1858 the American naturalist Spencer Baird designated the type as Garrulus californicus Vigors, 1839, the California scrub jay. The genus name combines the Ancient Greek αφελης/aphelēs meaning "smooth", "sleek" or "simple" with κομη/komē meaning "hair".

The species in this genus are believed to have evolved in the Pleistocene, and the Florida scrub jay is known to have been recognizably distinct and present in its current range for at least two million years. The inland, coastal, and Santa Cruz island populations of the (former) western scrub jay are now considered three separate species, California scrub jay, Island scrub jay and Woodhouse's scrub jay. Two different populations of the Mexican jay were also found to represent two separate species, with the Transvolcanic jay split off from it in 2008.

Phylogenetic analysis based on mitochondrial DNA sequences suggests three clades within the genus, the unicolored jays, scrub jays, and Mexican jays. Relationships among these clades are incompletely resolved, but suggest that the unicolor jays are sister to the remaining two clades.

The poor phylogenetic resolution provided by molecular data suggests that a rapid Late Pliocene radiation of the North American scrub jays led to the present diversity. Studies on the evolutionary history of Aphelocoma jays suggests that all New World jays originated in North America or Mesoamerica.

The genus contains seven species:

Image	Common name	Scientific name	Distribution
	Florida scrub jay	Aphelocoma coerulescens	
	Island scrub jay	Aphelocoma insularis	
	California scrub jay	Aphelocoma californica	
	Woodhouse's scrub jay	Aphelocoma woodhouseii	
	Mexican jay	Aphelocoma wollweberi	
	Transvolcanic jay	Aphelocoma ultramarina	
	Unicolored jay	Aphelocoma unicolor	

== Description ==
Aphelocoma jays are slightly larger than the blue jay and differ in having a longer tail, slightly shorter, more rounded wings, and no crest on the head. The top of the head, nape, and sides of the head are a rich, deep blue. Some species have a white stripe above the eye and dark ear coverts. The breast is also white or gray-white and the back is a gray-brown contrasting with the bright blue tail and wings in most species. One species, the unicolored jay, is blue all over, superficially similar to the pinyon jay from much further north. The bill, legs, and feet are black.

== Behavior ==
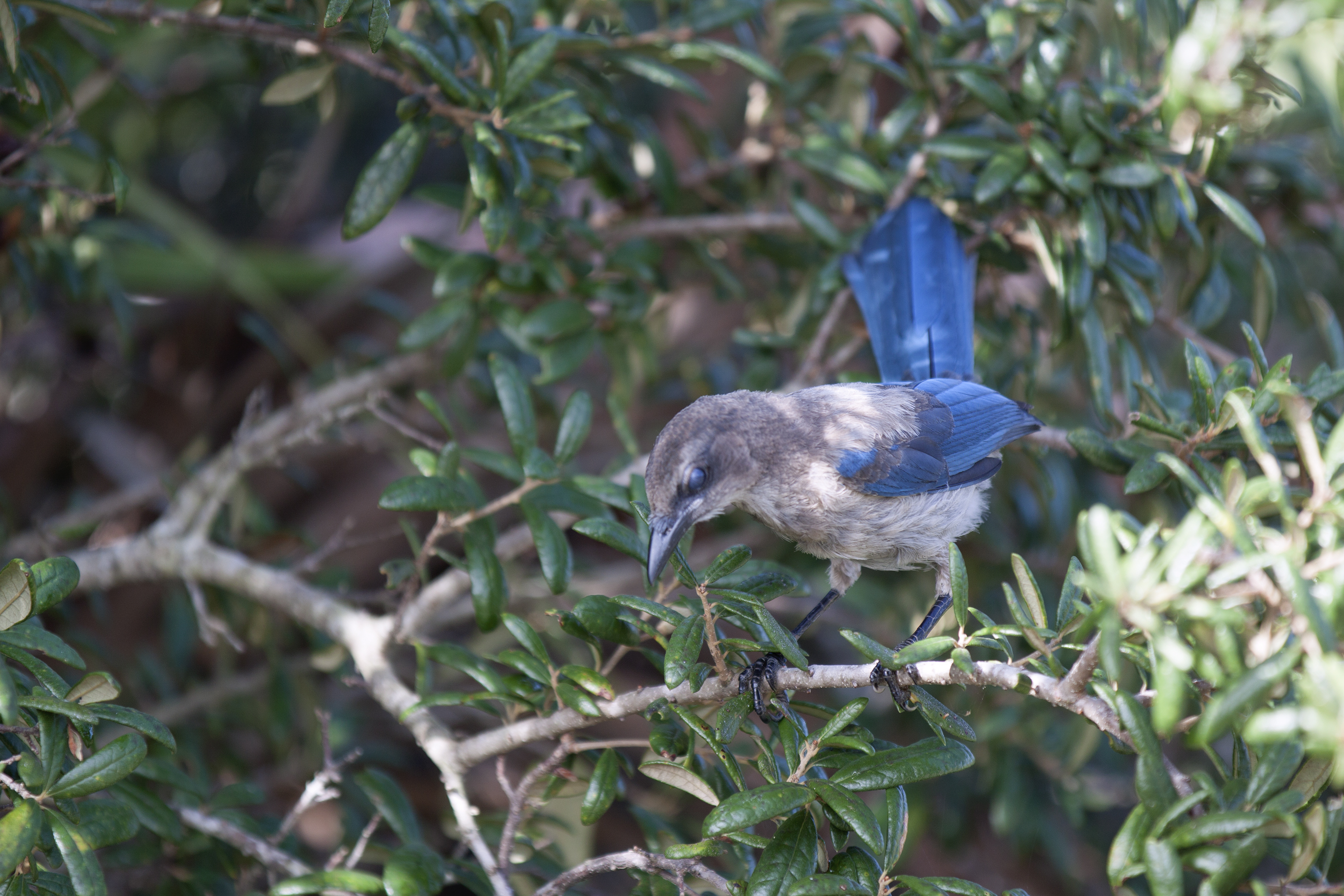
Juvenile Florida scrub jay at Merritt Island National Wildlife Refuge, Florida

The diet consists mainly of acorns and pine nuts. However, grain, berries, and other fruits are often eaten as well. These birds can also be omnivorous; their diet can include insects, eggs and nestlings, small frogs, mice, and reptiles. As food-storing birds, the scrub jays demonstrate a unique episodic memory. They can find their food hiding places with great precision, from several days to six months or more after the initial cache, and are able to distinguish between perishable foods like insect larvae (for which they only hold a short memory) and non-perishable food like nuts.

Wild Aphelocoma jays are frequent visitors at campsites and picnics and have frequently learned to eat from the hands of people where they have become accustomed to being fed.

The nest is in a tree or a bush, sometimes quite low down. The nests are compact and lined with hair and fine roots with an outer diameter of about 30 to 60 cm (12 to 24 in). Usually two to four eggs are laid and incubated over 14 to 16 days. There are two main variations of egg shell color: green with olive markings or a paler background of grayish-white to green with red-brown markings. The Florida scrub jay and the Mexican jay both have cooperative breeding systems involving several 'helpers' at each nest, usually relatives of the breeding pair.

Increased prolactin in the breeding pair leads to the expression of parental behavior and physiology. The source of the alloparental behavior found in helper birds has been the focus of many studies. A positive correlation was found between increased prolactin levels during the breeding period and helping behavior in non-breeding Aphelocoma jays. This suggests that helper birds do not simply respond to the calls of the young, but begin to show parental behavior even before the chicks hatch. These data suggest that natural selection may be acting on cooperative breeding in Aphelocoma jays and New World jays in general because the birds are reacting to more than just an environmental stimulus. Studies have also been done on Florida scrub jays (Aphelocoma coerulescens) and results have confirmed the hypothesis that increased prolactin levels are correlated with an increase in parental behavior in helper birds. Scrub jays are members of the family Corvidae, which are considered the most intelligent of the birds and among the most intelligent of all animals.

Aphelocoma jays are quite vocal and have a huge range of sounds and calls; common calls include a cheek, cheek, cheek and a guttural churring krr'r'r'r'r. Aphelocoma jays are also, like all other jays, often quite aggressive, antagonistic at feeding areas and sometimes regarded as a nuisance.
