= Volusia County Public Library =

The Volusia County Public Libraries are a group of public libraries found across Volusia County, Florida.

== History ==
Throughout their history, Volusia County Public Libraries were often started by women's clubs or associations which supported the library though memberships. They were often very small and located in small rooms in city halls or community centers. The collection consisted of second hand books donated from the citizens and there were not many professional librarians to run the facilities. Charlotte Smith, the head librarian at Stetson University, organized the Volusia County Public Library program in the year 1949 in an effort to upgrade libraries countywide. In the early 1950s in Florida, 200,000 people had no access to library services and only a quarter of the population had adequate service.

In the year 1956 Congress passed the Library Services Act which would provide funds to supplement or organize library service to communities with a population under 10,000. These funds were provided for a period of two years in order to help set up a county system. This act started the wheels turning for two state officials, Elizabeth Cole, Florida State Public Library Consultant and Vera Nistendirk, Director of Extension Services. These two finally got the committee to recommend the formation of a unified county library system to the County Commissioners on April 12, 1961. By September 1961, the county library system went into operation and a library board member was appointed who then in turn hired the first Director of the Volusia County Public Library. All decisions were approved by the County Council. By May 1962, ten municipal and private libraries were organized into the Volusia County Libraries.

By October 1, 1962, eight branches of the Volusia County Library System were in operation as well as the Library Headquarters and the Bookmobile Services. By October, 1980, all thirteen branches of the Volusia County Public Library had been established. Since then, with the help of Volusia County and the Friends of the Library groups, equipment, furnishings, and books have been purchased to keep up with the times and provide current information and exceptional service to the citizens of Volusia County. The DeLand Friends group, founded in 1958, recently raised $160,000 for their library. In 2014, the group funded and opened a book store. While the DeLand Friends group has the most robust online presence, there are other groups in DeBary, Deltona, Edgewater, Lake Helen, New Smyrna Beach, Oak Hill, Ormond Beach, and Port Orange. The first computers were introduced in 1981, updated processing equipment arrived in 1983, and a data entry and barcoding system was introduced in December 1990. All throughout the county, library buildings were getting updated or new buildings all together. By 1991, the Library Support Center was moved into their own building and out of the City Island, Daytona Beach Regional Library. Six regional branches were named around that time. They are Daytona Beach Regional Library, DeLand Regional Library, Ormond Beach Regional Library, Port Orange Regional Library, Deltona Regional Library, and New Smyrna Beach Regional Library. The branches were designated as DeBary Public Library, Edgewater Public Library, Hope Place Library, Keech Street (John H. Dickerson Public Library, Lake Helen Public Library, Orange City Public Library, Oak Hill Public Library, and Pierson Public Library. A loose federation of community libraries has evolved into a progressive system of 14 libraries, plus the Library Support building, which has a staff of 168 full-time employees and 29 student workers, and has made all of the libraries linked by computer technology. There are also roughly 5,000 Friends of the Library members and a little more than 1,000 citizen volunteers.

In 2010, the Holly Hill library branch was closed by the County to cut costs. To ease the loss of library access to the surrounding community, a self-service lending machines for library materials, similar to a Redbox movie rental dispenser, was placed. The following year, upon review, the service was discontinued.

Access would return nearly ten years later with the opening of the Hope Place Library in June 2019. Named after the transitional shelter for homeless families next door, this new edition was made possible by a $1.1 million construction project federal grant, which also marked the first time grant money was used for library services in Volusia county. This new branch also included a playground and basketball courts behind the building.

In 2014 record rainfall occurred in Daytona Beach, causing the temporary closure of Volusia's John H. Dickerson Heritage library. Adversity struck again in the form of Hurricane Irma crippling Volusia's largest branch, City Island in September 2017.

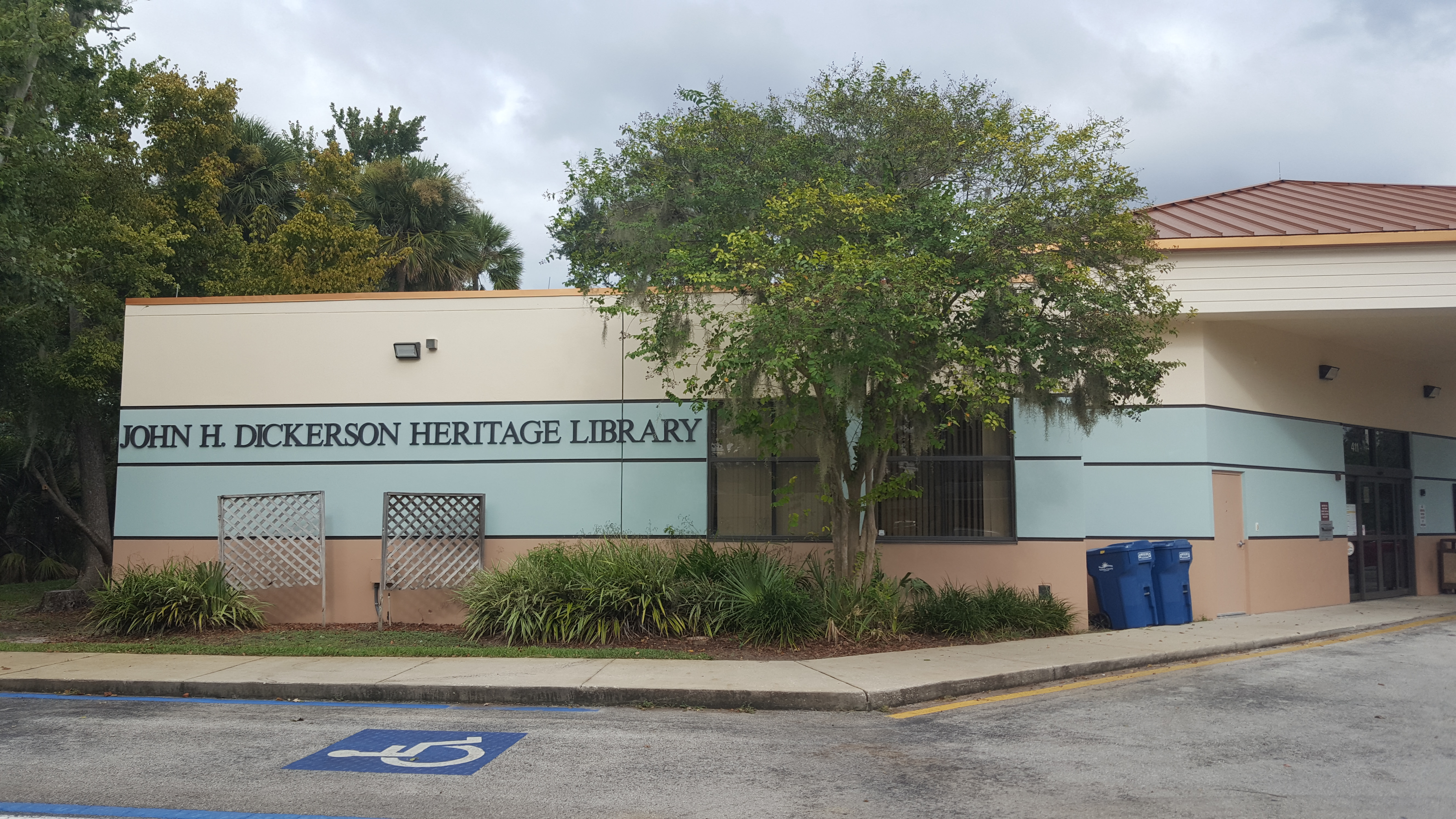
John H. Dickerson Heritage Library, Daytona Beach viewed from Keech Street.

After Irma's devastating blow, Volusia County expanded library hours in Daytona Beach at the John H. Dickerson Heritage Library. Undaunted, City Island reopened its doors in May 2018 following repairs costing almost 1.5 million dollars. City Island library relaxed fines for children at the same time expanding the children's play area, including a fenced-in playground, additional playground equipment, two pavilions, a sidewalk, security lighting and security cameras.

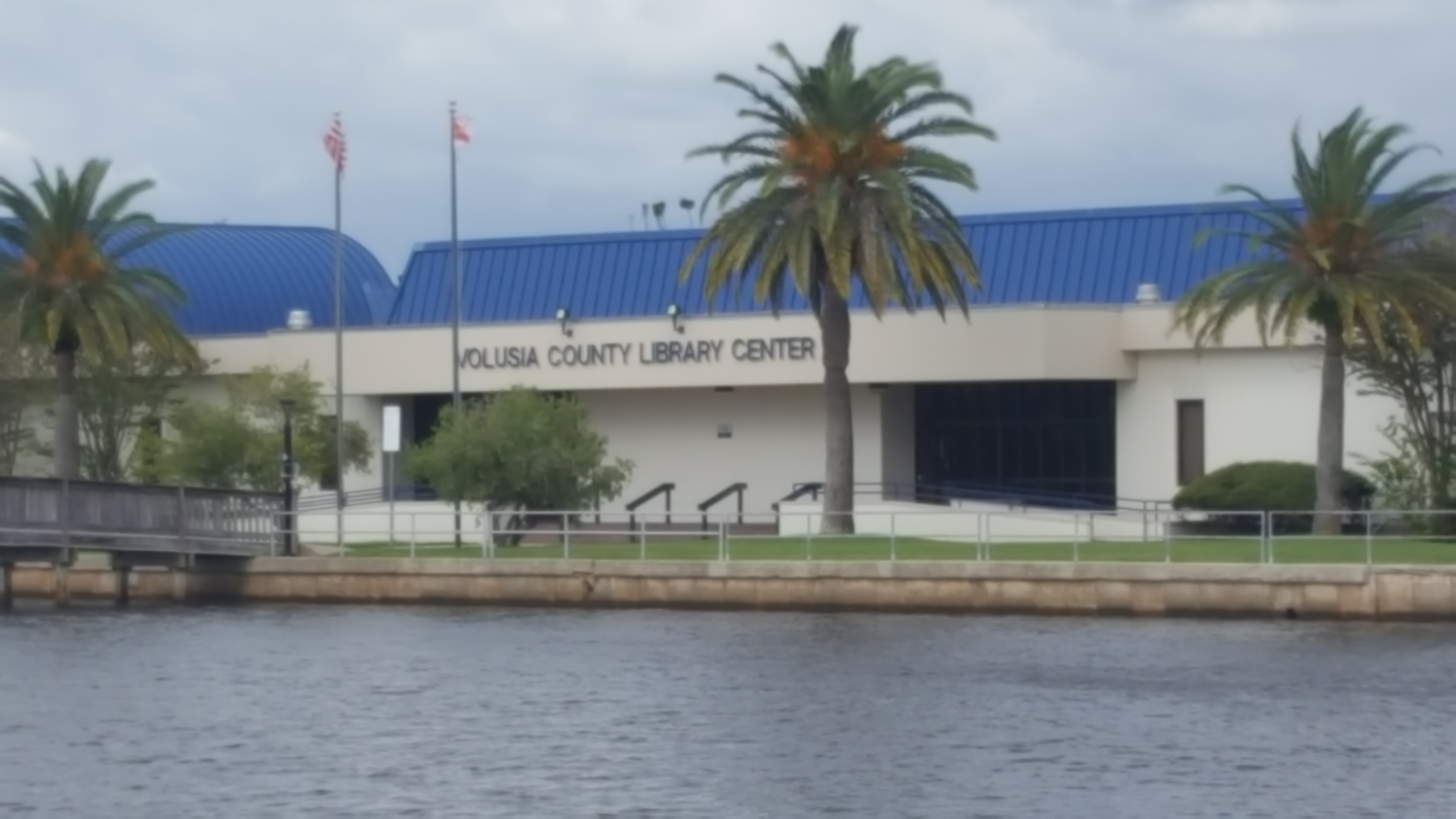
Volusia County Library Center at City Island seen from Beech Street.

Tragedy would once again strike Keech Street (John H. Dickerson Heritage Library) with Hurricane Ian in September 2022. The library would suffer massive flooding and be closed for repairs. As of February 2023, library service is conducted in a module unit in the parking lot of the still closed library.

== Services ==
Library cards are free for Volusia county residents. Non-residents are charged $30.00 for a six-month membership and $50.00 for a one-year membership. Customers may check out up to 100 items at a time and can check out books, audiobooks, and hotspots for 21 days, while express books and launchpads are checked out for 14 days, and CDs DVDs and magazines are checked out for 7 days

In an effort to expand services, Volusia County Libraries allow reciprocal borrowing. Customers from Brevard, Flagler, Lake, and Putnam counties may borrow physical materials from Volusia county with their photo ID, library card, and verification of address. Access to digital content through reciprocal borrowing is limited

Among the library upgrades are RFID tags and self checkout stations.

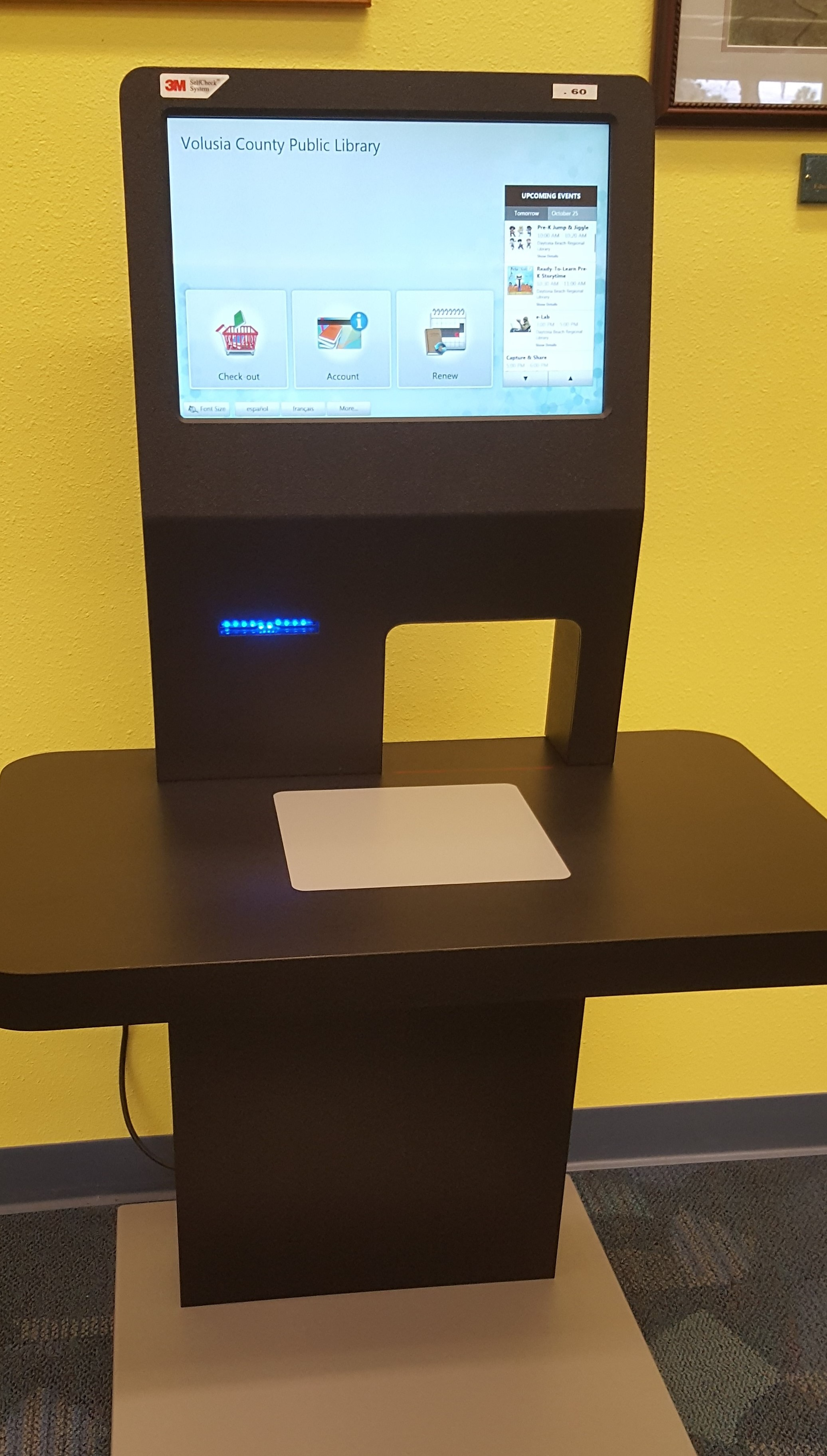
Self checkout station

During the COVID-19 pandemic, Youth Services departments at Volusia County libraries introduced a program called "Lit Kits to Go!" which took the place of their usual summer reading program. Parents and children would fill out a form detailing the child's interests so that library staff could select a personalized set of books. Along with the books, children would receive crafts and activities to supplement their learning over the summer. Over the course of the program, libraries fulfilled over 800 requests for kits

Lit Kits proved so successful the service became permanent with registration available in person or online. The service initially targeted K-5, but was expanded to include the age groups of 0-2 (Toddlers) and 3-5 (Preschool). Northeast Florida Library Information Network (NEFLIN) presented the 2020 Innovation Award to Volusia County Public Library system for their Lit Kit to Go program.
