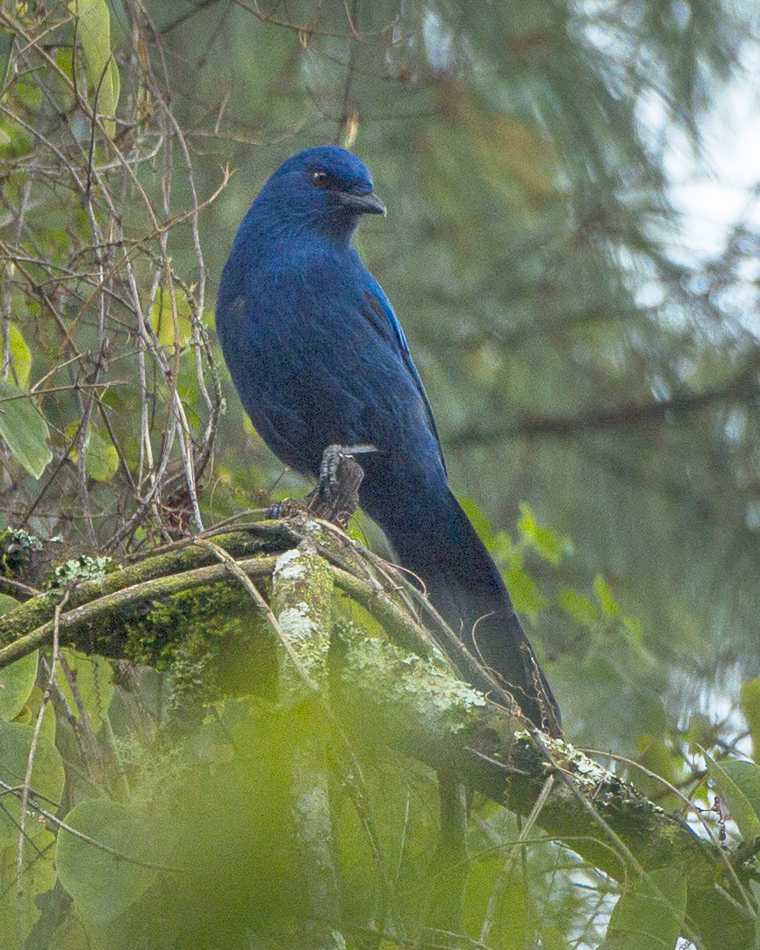
- In Oaxaca, Mexico

Conservation status
- Least Concern (IUCN 3.1)

Scientific classification
- Kingdom: Animalia
- Phylum: Chordata
- Class: Aves
- Order: Passeriformes
- Family: Corvidae
- Genus: Aphelocoma
- Species: A. unicolor

Binomial name
- Aphelocoma unicolor (Du Bus de Gisignies, 1847)

= Unicolored jay =

Species of bird

The unicolored jay (Aphelocoma unicolor) is a species of bird in the family Corvidae, the crows and jays. It is found in El Salvador, Guatemala, Honduras, and Mexico.

== Taxonomy and systematics ==
The unicolored jay was originally described in 1847 as Cyanocorax unicolor. Its current genus Aphelocoma is from Latinized Ancient Greek apheles- (from ἀφελής-) "simple" + Latin coma (from Greek kome κόμη) "hair", in reference to the lack of striped or banded feathers in this genus, compared to other jays. It is apparently a basal member of the genus.

The unicolored jay has these five subspecies:

- A. u. guerrerensis Nelson, 1903
- A. u. concolor (Cassin, 1848)
- A. u. oaxacae Pitelka, 1946
- A. u. unicolor (Du Bus de Gisignies, 1847)
- A. u. griscomi Van Rossem, 1928

Some of the subspecies were originally described as full species. The five exhibit much genetic variation and have long been isolated from each other. In 2020 the American Ornithological Society declined to reclassify them into four species.

== Description ==
The unicolored jay is about 34 cm (13 in) long. The nominate subspecies A. u. unicolor weighs about 125 to 150 g (4.4 to 5.3 oz). The sexes have the same plumage. The nominate subspecies is entirely deep blue to purplish blue that is somewhat darker on the sides of the head and the throat. Juveniles are a slightly bluish gray that is duller than adult plumage. Subspecies A. u. griscomi has the same plumage as the nominate. A. u. guerrerensis is the most purplish subspecies, A. u. concolor is a paler blue than the nominate, and A. u. oaxacae is somewhat darker than the nominate. Adults of all subspecies have a dark brown iris, a black bill, and black legs and feet. Immatures have pale bills.

== Distribution and habitat ==
The unicolored jay has a highly disjunct distribution. The subspecies are found thus:

- A. u. guerrerensis southwestern Mexico in the Sierra Madre del Sur of west-central Guerrero
- A. u. concolor: eastern Mexican states of eastern Hidalgo, west-central Veracruz, México, and Puebla
- A. u. oaxacae: southern Mexico in Oaxaca
- A. u. unicolor: Mexico's Chiapas state and Guatemala's Sierra de las Minas
- A. u. griscomi: northern El Salvador, western and central Honduras, and incidentally in extreme north-central Nicaragua

The unicolored jay is a bird of the subtropical and lower temperate zones. In Chiapas it primarily inhabits pine-oak forest with a somewhat open canopy. Elsewhere it is found in pine-oak, cloudforest, and pine savanna. Sources differ on the species' overall elevational range with both 1,500 to 3,000 m (4,900 to 9,800 ft) and 1,300 to 3,300 m (4,300 to 10,800 ft) being stated. Outside of Mexico it ranges from 1,750 to 3,050 m (5,700 to 10,000 ft).

== Behavior ==
=== Movement ===
The unicolored jay is a year-round resident.

=== Feeding ===
The unicolored jay is omnivorous. Most of the diet data come from Montebello, Chiapas, where it was observed feeding on various fruits, many types of larval and adult insects, discarded human food, and once a hummingbird nestling. There the species foraged in vegetation and only rarely on the ground, searching bromeliads, foliage, and branches and sometimes hanging upside down.

=== Breeding ===
Most data on the unicolored jay's breeding biology is from Montebello. The species is a cooperative breeder with groups of up to nine birds formed by one primary pair, non- or seldom-breeding males, non-breeding females, and the main pair's offspring. The breeding season spans from mid-January at least to April. The nest has a foundation of sticks lined with Usnea lichen and sometimes some pine needles. Usually the primary pair built the nest but sometimes other group members contributed. Nests were found between about 5.5 and 13.5 m (18 and 44 ft) above the ground and mostly in oak trees. The only described clutch was of three unmarked pale blue eggs. The group's primary female alone incubated the clutch; the incubation period is not known. Fledging occurred 21 to 26 days after hatch. Many members of the group provisioned the brooding female and nestlings.

=== Vocalization ===
Though recordings of unicolored jay vocalizations come from most of its range, detailed analyses come primarily from the Montebello studies. The birds there made hundreds of variants of their calls though many were only subtly different from each other. The calls were described as grating/harsh, musical/resonant, whistled, loud, and soft. Some have been written as weet, zhreenk, ralph, gronk, cleemp, dzee-oo, poit, kuk, and wah.

== Status ==
The IUCN has assessed the unicolored jay as being of Least Concern. It has a very large range; its estimated population of at least 50,000 mature individuals is believed to be decreasing. No immediate threats have been identified. It is considered "rare to uncommon and local" in northern Central America.
