= NEFLIN =

- Northeast Florida Library Information Network
- Founded: 1992
- Location: Orange Park, Florida
- Director: Bradley R. Ward
- Website: www.neflin.org

NEFLIN, the Northeast Florida Library Information Network, is one of five non-profit library cooperatives committed to serving libraries throughout Florida.

NEFLIN formed as a result of librarians in North Florida wanting to collaborate on resources and services for patrons. An LSCA grant in 1992 provided the means for a feasibility study, which revealed the need for a cooperative library organization through the report "A Plan for Northeast Florida Library Information Network (NEFLIN)." Established in 1992, NEFLIN's members employ 2,720 services 550 public, academic, school, and specialized libraries located within its 24 county service area, which serves over 4 million people.

NEFLIN is governed by a nine-member, elected, Board of Directors that represents each type of library in the cooperative.

Through grant funding and membership dues, NEFLIN provides members access to training and continuing education, resource sharing, research and development, partnerships for grant funding, leadership opportunities, and additional services through relationships with other organizations.

NEFLIN also offers award to NEFLIN members and member institutions, such as the Continuing Education Award for Making the Most of NEFLIN and the NEFLIN Member of the Year.

== Florida's multitype library cooperatives ==
NEFLIN is one of five multitype library cooperatives (MLCs) in Florida. The other four are:

- Panhandle Library Access Network
- Southeast Florida Library Information Network
- Southwest Florida Library Network
- Tampa Bay Library Consortium

The MLCs facilitate the statewide delivery service, reciprocal borrowing, and interlibrary loan program in Florida.
