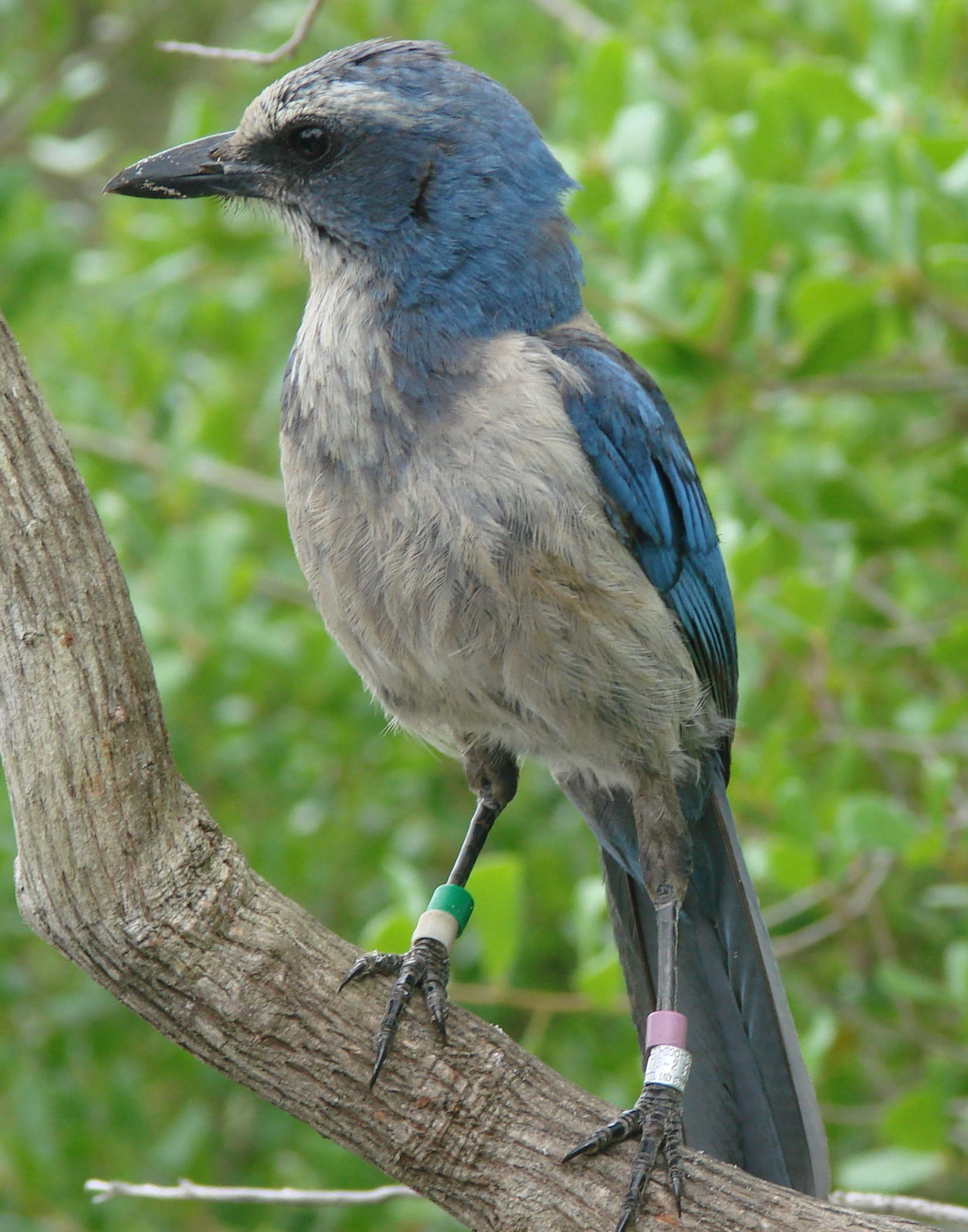
- Adult in Lyonia Preserve, near Deltona, Florida

Conservation status
- Vulnerable (IUCN 3.1)

- Critically Imperiled (NatureServe)

Scientific classification
- Kingdom: Animalia
- Phylum: Chordata
- Class: Aves
- Order: Passeriformes
- Family: Corvidae
- Genus: Aphelocoma
- Species: A. coerulescens

Binomial name
- Aphelocoma coerulescens (Bosc, 1795)
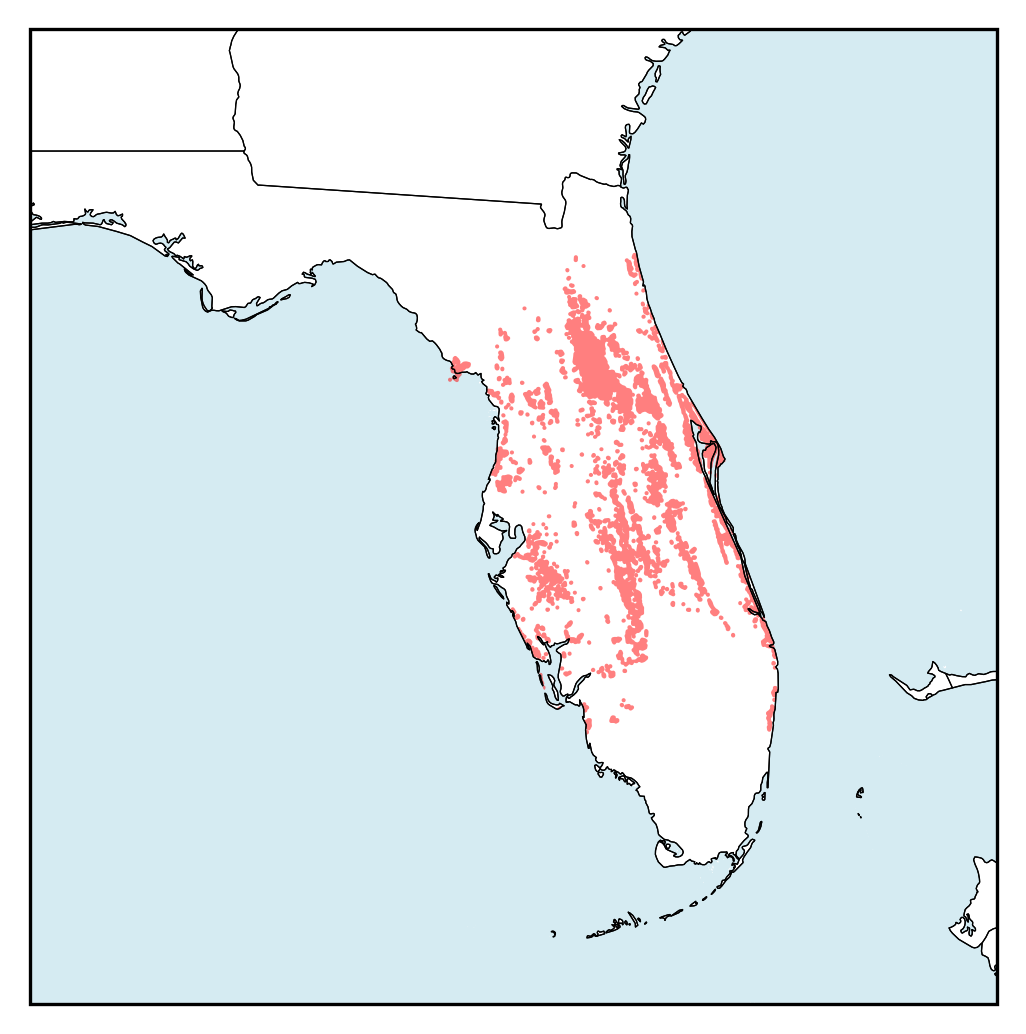

Synonyms
- Corvus floridanus Bartram, 1791; Corvus coerulescens Bosc, 1795; Aphelocoma californica coerulescens

= Florida scrub jay =

Florida scrub jay Temporal range: Gelasian - recent, 2–0 Ma

Species of bird

The Florida scrub jay (Aphelocoma coerulescens^{[A]}) is one of the species of scrub jay native to North America. It is the only species of bird endemic to the U.S. state of Florida and one of only 15 species endemic to the continental United States. Because of this, it is keenly sought by birders. It is known to have been present in Florida as a distinct species for at least 2 million years, and is possibly derived from the ancestors of Woodhouse's scrub jay.

== Description ==
It measures 23 to 28 cm (9.1 to 11.0 in) in length, and weighs from 66 to 92 g (2.3 to 3.2 oz), with an average 80.2 g (2.83 oz). The wingspan of the jay is 33–36 cm (13–14 in). It has a strong black bill, blue head and nape without a crest, a whitish forehead and supercilium, blue bib, blue wings, grayish underparts, gray back, long blue tail, black legs and feet.

== Ecology ==
The Florida scrub jay is found only in Florida scrub habitat, an ecosystem that exists only in central Florida and in limited areas along the Atlantic coast, and is characterized by nutrient-poor soil, occasional drought, and frequent wildfires. Because of its being isolated from the mainland as an island (Orange Island) 34 to 28 million years ago and somewhat harsh weather pattern, this habitat in isolation evolved to host not only the Florida scrub jay endemic only to Florida, but also a small assortment of very ancient specific plants, including sand pine, sand live oak, myrtle oak, Chapman's oak, sandhill oak, Florida rosemary and various other hardy plants such as eastern prickly pear.

Florida scrub jays are omnivorous and eat a wide variety of acorns, seeds, peanuts, insects, tree frogs, turtles, snakes, lizards, and young mice. They have also been occasionally observed to eat other birds' eggs or nestlings, but this occurs rarely. They routinely cache thousands of acorns a year, burying them just beneath the surface. The acorns are typically buried in the fall and consumed during the winter and spring. Acorns that are forgotten or missed may germinate, making the Florida scrub jay an effective agent for the dispersal of a variety of oak trees.

The Florida scrub jay may exhibit coordinated cooperative hunting, as seen in one case where a mated pair of the birds were observed attacking a black racer together in southcentral Florida. The snake may have been too large for one jay to kill it alone, and the pair ultimately succeeded in killing the reptile. Cooperated hunting like this is rarely documented in passerines.

Scrub jays may also take silverware and other shiny objects in a manner similar to the American crow.

=== Reproduction ===
Florida scrub jays are one of the few cooperative breeding birds in North America. Fledglings remain in their parents' habitat for several years and help to rear young, watch for predators (such as short-tailed hawks or Accipiter), and defend territory against neighboring Florida scrub jay family groups. These families can range in size from 2 to 8.

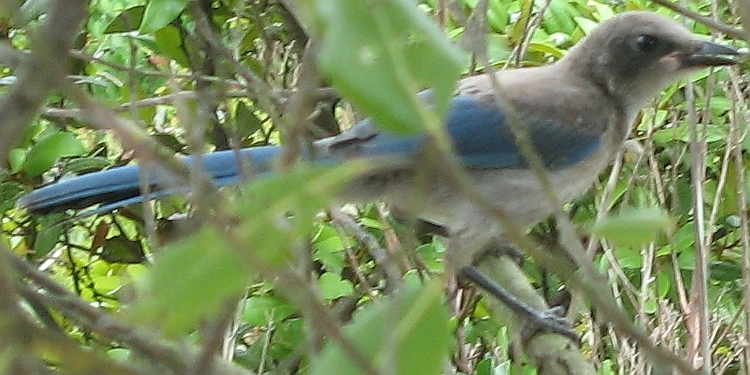
Juvenile

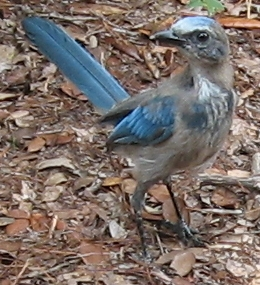
Juvenile developing adult coloration

After about 2 to 3 years, fledglings leave the group to form mating pairs of their own. Mating season ranges from March to June. Clutches usually contain about 3 to 4 eggs which are incubated in about 17 days. Fledging occurs in about 16 to 19 days. Fledglings can be distinguished from the adult birds due to the coloration of the feathers on their head, which are brown instead of blue. The brown feathers on the juvenile's head are slowly replaced by blue feathers as the bird matures into adulthood.

== Conservation ==
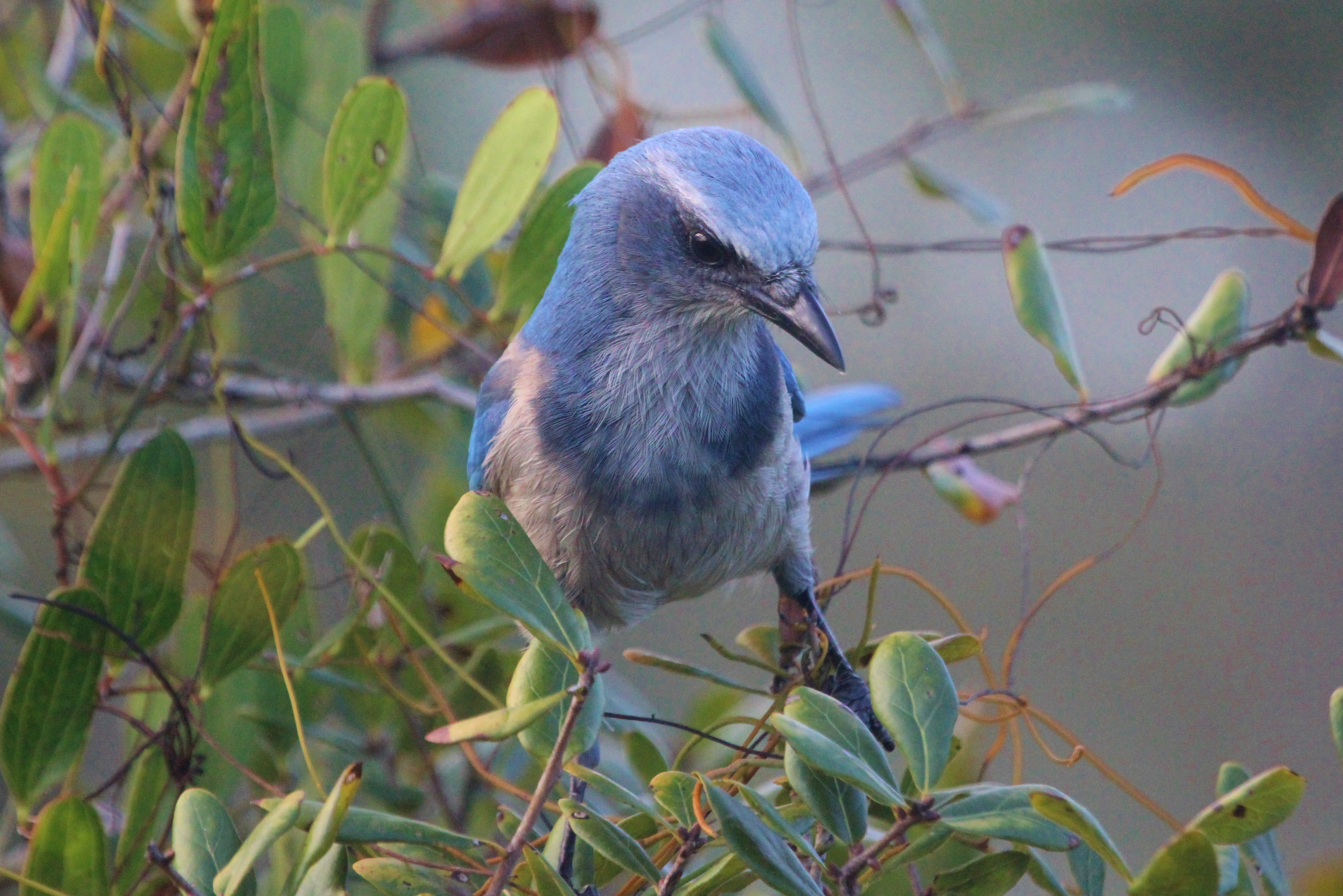
A Florida scrub jay explores its surroundings

Scrub habitat has dwindled considerably in the past several decades as Florida has continued to develop. Wildfire suppression also leads to the natural succession of large oaks and trees which changes the habitat. In recent years, environmental groups within the state have made a strong effort at preserving Florida's remaining scrub through controlled burns and even clearing out areas of large trees to increase the size of a scrub habitat. Because scrub habitat is typically "well-drained sites with low nutrient levels and periodic fires," the species is vulnerable to climate change. Oscar Scherer State Park near Sarasota has one of the larger habitats under state management.

The Florida scrub jay was officially listed as a threatened state species by Florida Fish and Wildlife Conservation Commission in 1975 and it was listed as a threatened federal species by the United States Fish and Wildlife Service in 1987.

According to Partners in Flight, there were estimated to be 4000 individuals left in the wild. Despite the protections, the Florida scrub jay is still thought to be on the decline. Studies done in Brevard County, once the county with the greatest population of scrub jays, has noted declines of some 33% since the 1993 census alone.

Another attempt to conserve the bird is an ongoing campaign to name the Florida scrub jay as the new state bird of Florida. The main argument for changing the state bird is that the current state bird (viz. the northern mockingbird) is the state bird of several other states, while the scrub jay is exclusive to Florida.

In recent years there has been some debate about whether or not the Florida scrub jay should be officially listed as an Endangered Species because of the loss of habitat. However, environmentalists hope that current conservation efforts should help the species population to at least stabilize.

On the other hand, the IUCN classifies this species as vulnerable to extinction. In 2004, the population was declining and no more than 10 subpopulations were known. Both the number of adult birds as well as amount and quality of habitat were in decline, and local subpopulations were in danger of disappearing altogether. About 8000 mature birds were believed to exist—with no more than 1000 in any one subpopulation—and population numbers had dropped by about 10% over the last decade or so.

A long-term and ongoing study of the Florida scrub jay has been taking place at the Archbold Biological Station at Lake Placid.

The Florida scrub jay was featured in episode 11, season 3 of the Showtime television series Penn & Teller: Bullshit!.

=== Dangers of human feeding ===
Highly intelligent, Florida Scrub Jays are prone to imprinting and habituation, appearing remarkably tame. This behavior leads them to be less afraid of humans, making them more likely to take food from people's hands.

Unfortunately, this tameness is dangerous to the well-being of the species. Florida scrub jays that are fed by humans will reproduce earlier in the year than those that are not. However, fledgling scrub jays feed primarily on caterpillars present in the late spring and summer; if they hatch too early in the year when the caterpillars are not available, this can lead to their malnutrition or starvation.

Another potential danger of feeding Florida scrub jays occurs when people feed them near a road, as one major cause of death for scrub jays in urban areas is collision with vehicles. Since humans build subdivisions, railroads, and highways on the highest and driest ground, where Florida scrub jays like to live, this removal of habitats, along with the introduction of pets, especially cats not on a leash, has devastated scrub jay populations. In the last 100 years, 90% of the bird's population has been lost.

== Gallery ==
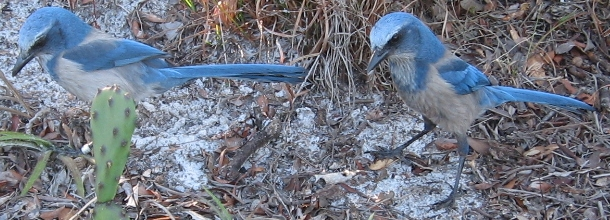
Two adults at Lyonia Preserve

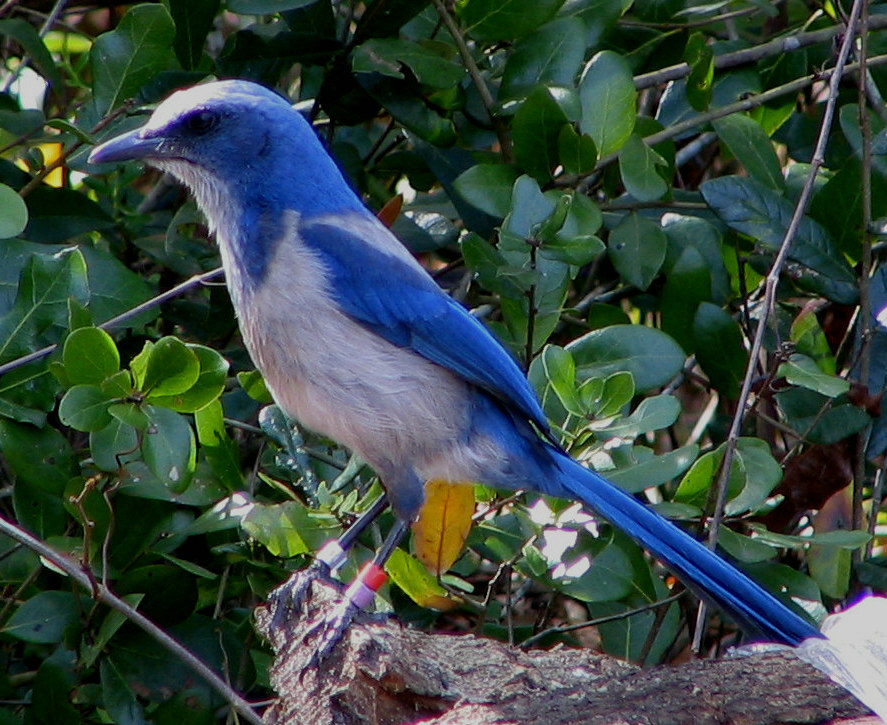
Adult

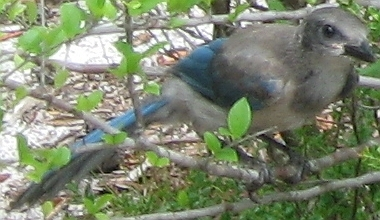
Brown-colored head of a juvenile

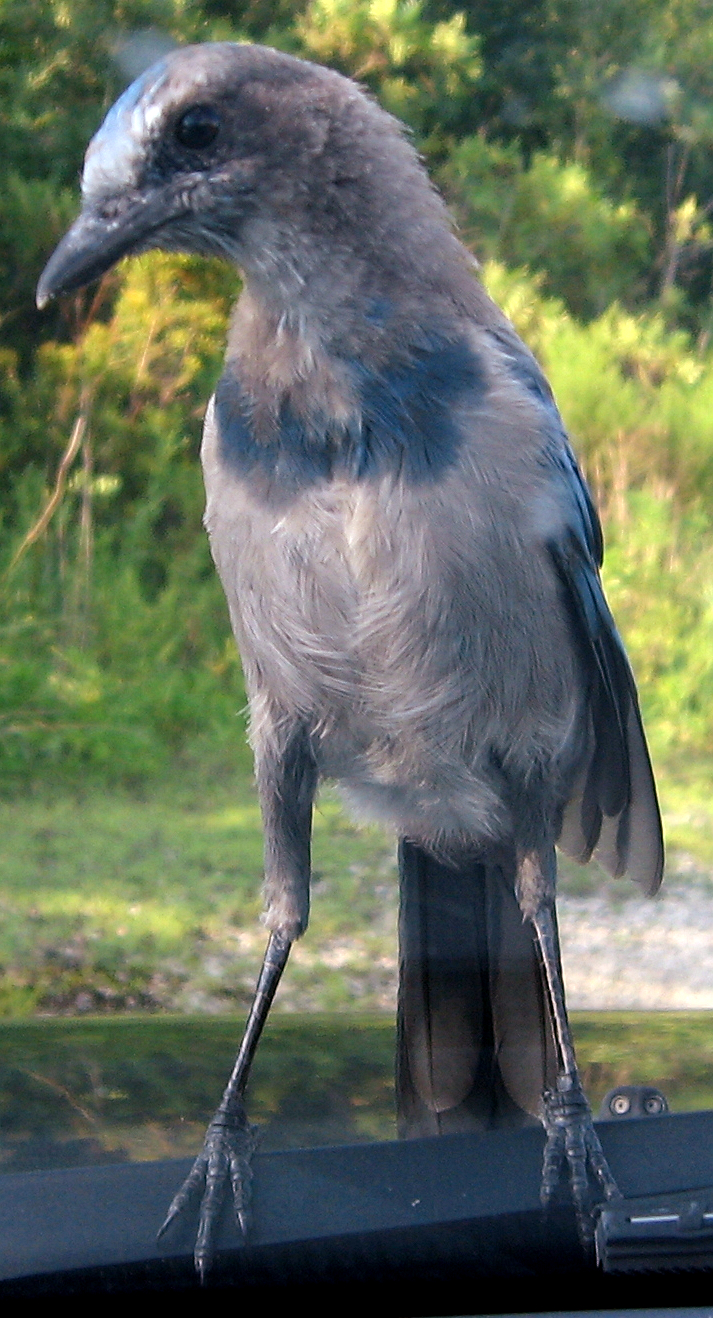
Juvenile beginning to develop blue coloration on its head

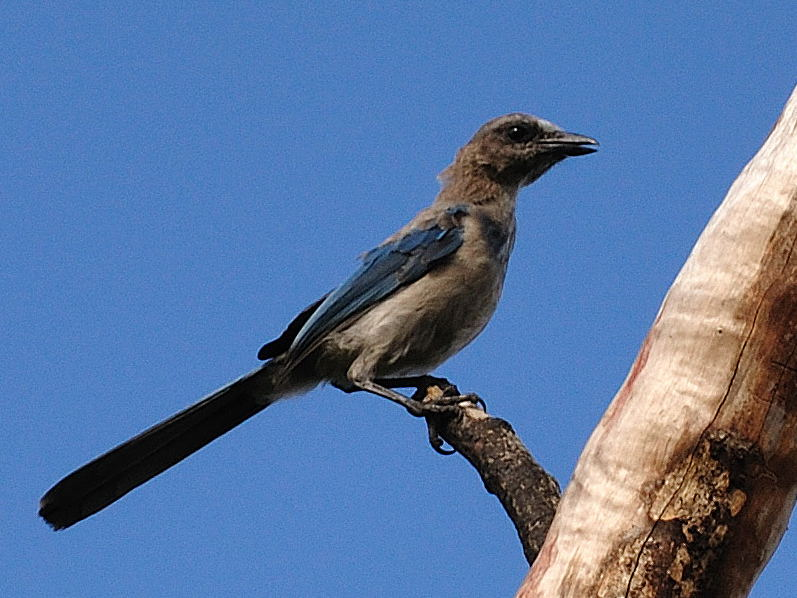
Juvenile at Juniper Prairie in Ocala National Forest

== Footnotes ==
^{A} Etymology: Aphelocoma, from Latinized Ancient Greek apheles- (from ἀφελής-) "simple" + Latin coma (from Greek kome κόμη) "hair", in reference to the lack of striped or banded feathers in this genus, compared to other jays. coerulescens, Latin for "becoming blue", in reference to the species' color which is lighter than in most American jays.

== Predation ==
In Florida, Florida scrub jays may be eaten by some growth stage of invasive snakes such as Burmese pythons, reticulated pythons, Southern African rock pythons, Central African rock pythons, boa constrictors, yellow anacondas, Bolivian anacondas, dark-spotted anacondas, and green anacondas.
