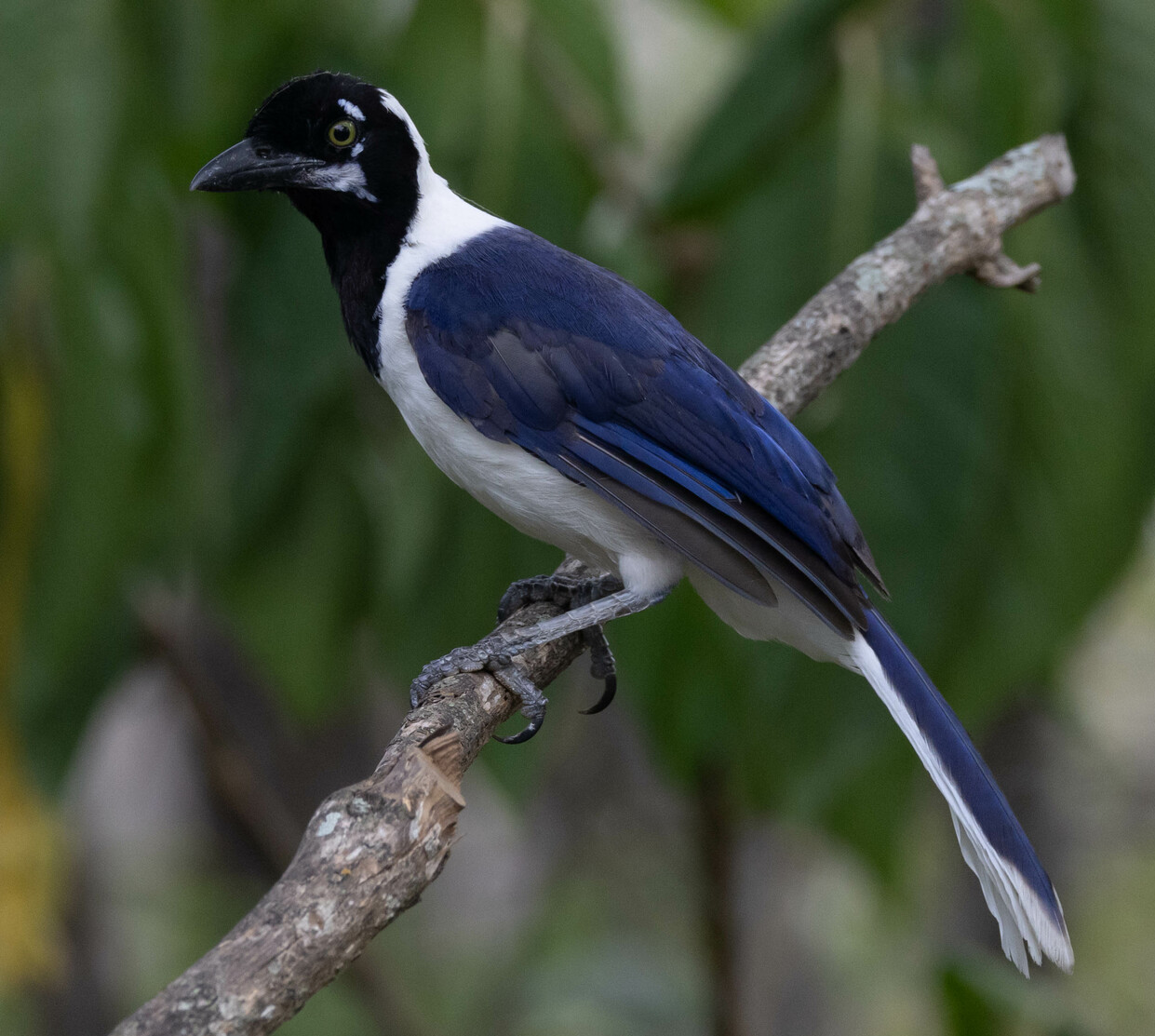

Conservation status
- Least Concern (IUCN 3.1)

Scientific classification
- Kingdom: Animalia
- Phylum: Chordata
- Class: Aves
- Order: Passeriformes
- Family: Corvidae
- Genus: Cyanocorax
- Species: C. mystacalis

Binomial name
- Cyanocorax mystacalis (L. E. G. de Sparre, 1835)
- Range (year-round)

Audio
- White-tailed jay vocalization

= White-tailed jay =

Species of bird

The white-tailed jay (Cyanocorax mystacalis), also known as the moustached jay, is a species of bird in the crow family Corvidae. It is found in Ecuador and Peru. It has a black face with white spots above and below the eyes, and a small white moustachial stripe. It has a white nape, belly, and underparts. Its back and wings are greyish-blue, extending most of the way down the tail. The rectrices and tail tip are white. It has several calls, the most common being described as "cha-cha-cha-cha".

The white-tailed jay was first described by the French ornithologist Louis Ernest Gustave de Sparre in 1835 and was given the scientific name Pica mystacalis. It was later placed in the genus Cyanocorax. It is visually very similar to the tufted jay, which is found in Mexico over 4,800 km (3,000 mi) away, and the two species were incorrectly thought to be close relatives. The white-tailed jay's relationship to others in the genus Cyanocorax is still unclear.

The white-tailed jay lives in semi-humid, semi-open woodlands, preferring to remain near thick vegetation close to rivers and streams. It eats mostly insects and seeds, but has also been known to steal eggs from the nests of other birds. It forages in flocks and can be found feeding on the ground more often than other members of the genus Cyanocorax. While little is known of its breeding and nesting habits, it is known to build nests through February and March and may nest close to villages. The white-tailed jay is considered a species of least concern by the International Union for Conservation of Nature, although its population has seen notable decreases in some regions. The largest threat to its survival is habitat destruction.

== Taxonomy and systematics ==
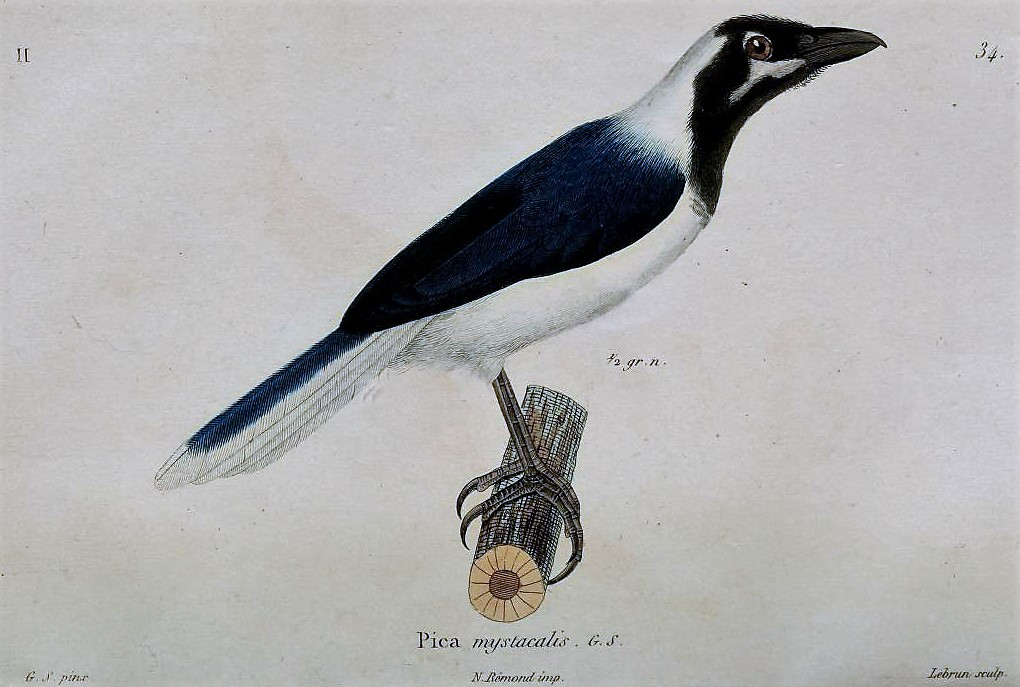
A drawing of the white-tailed jay done by de Sparre

The white-tailed jay, also known as the moustached jay, was first described in 1835 by the French ornithologist Louis Ernest Gustave de Sparre, who placed it in the genus Pica with the scientific name Pica mystacalis. It is now placed in the genus Cyanocorax, which was introduced by the German zoologist Friedrich Boie in 1826. The white-tailed jay has no recognized subspecies.

The white-tailed jay is visually similar to the tufted jay found in Mexico. The tufted jay lives within a restricted region of the Sierra Madre Occidental, over 4,800 km (3,000 mi) from the range of the white-tailed jay. While many believed this was likely indicative of a common ancestor between the species, others proposed that the two might be the same species, and that the tufted jay had been brought to Mexico by pre-Columbian trade. In 2010, a mitochondrial DNA study of the genus Cyanocorax proved that the white-tailed jay was a distinct species from the tufted jay, and although they descend from a common ancestor, they are not particularly closely related. This study also demonstrated that the white-tailed jay was monophyletic, although its exact position in relation to others in the genus was ambiguous.

The following cladogram (simplified from the 2010 mitochondrial DNA study) shows the relationship between species in the genus Cyanocorax.

- - Inca jay (C. yncas)
  - White-tailed jay (C. mystacalis)
  - - - - - - - - Cayenne jay (C. cayanus)
              - - Plush-crested jay (C. chrysops)
                - White-naped jay (C. cyanopogon)
            - - Azure-naped jay (C. heilprini)
              - Black-chested jay (C. affinis)
          - Tufted jay (C. dickeyi)
        - - Bushy-crested jay (C. melanocyaneus)
          - - Yucatan jay (C. yucatanicus)
            - - San Blas jay (C. sanblasianus)
              - Purplish-backed jay (C. beecheii)

== Description ==
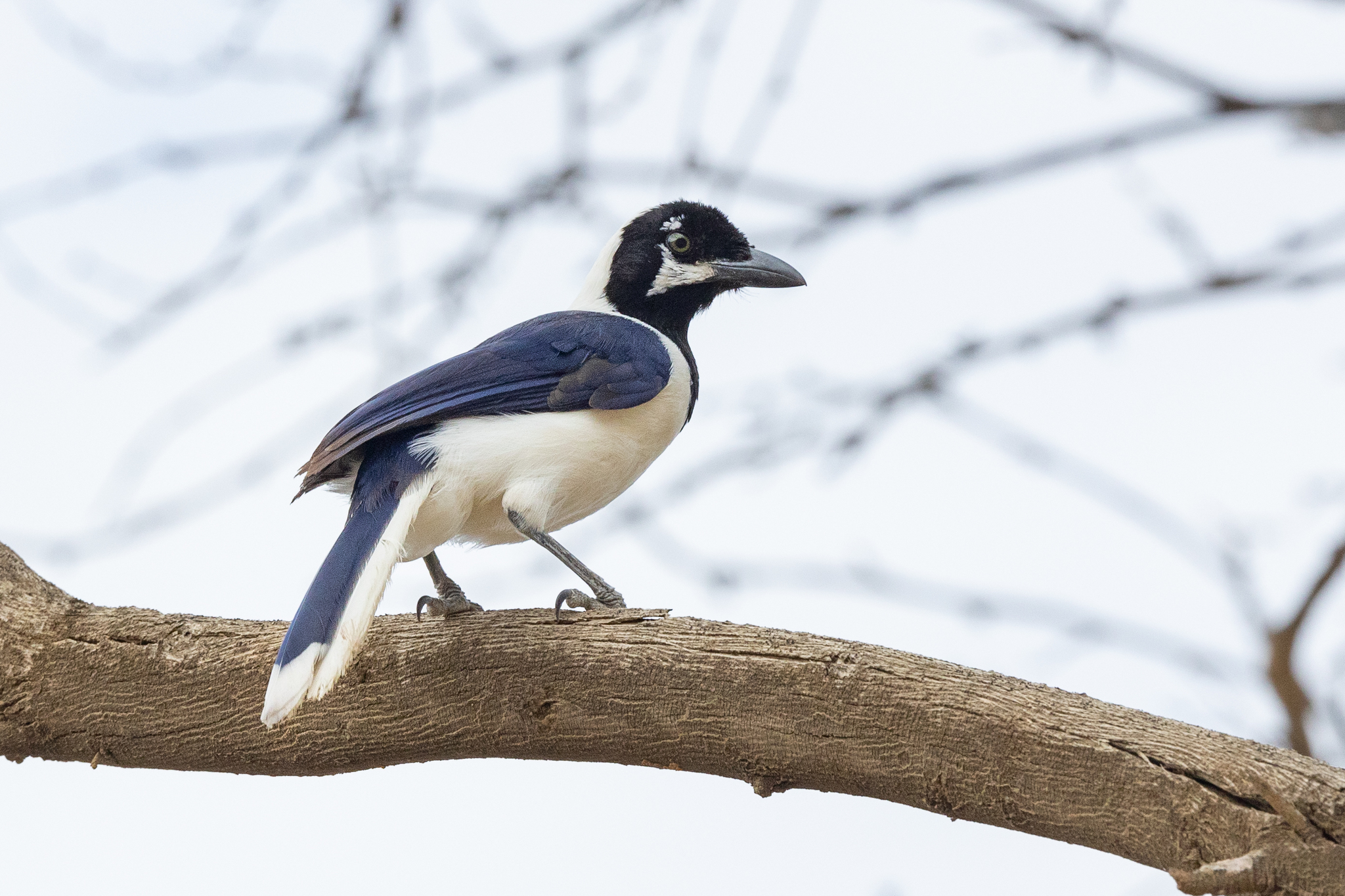
An adult white-tailed jay

The white-tailed jay is overall white and bluish, with a black head. Its face is mostly black, with a small white spot above the eye, a small white moustachial stripe, and a somewhat larger white spot on the cheek. It has a white nape and belly. The back and wings are a greyish-blue, which extends down the top of the tail. The rectrices, tail tip, and underside of the tail are white. It has bright yellow irises. There are no visual differences between the sexes. Juveniles have brown irises and lack both the white spot above the eye and the moustachial stripe. These features last until the first moult.

The white-tailed jay is roughly 33 cm (13 in) in length. One individual measured had a wing length of 146 mm (5.7 in), a 147 mm (5.8 in) tail, 40 mm (1.6 in) tarsi, and a 40 mm (1.6 in) beak. Weight measurements come from a single pair, with the male weighing 160 g (5.6 oz) and the female weighing 149 g (5.3 oz).

Little is known of the vocalizations of the white-tailed jay. Their most common call is described as "cha-cha-cha-cha", varying in pitch throughout. It is thought that this may be used socially. They also make a high-pitched "clewp-clewp" call. The white-tailed jay has fewer vocalizations than other species in its genus. This is likely because of its habitat, as it prefers open areas where visual communication is more useful.

The white-tailed jay is unique within its range, with no other species being visually similar. It is visually very similar to the tufted jay but their ranges do not overlap. Additionally, compared to the tufted jay, the white-tailed jay lacks a crest, has white on its outer wings, and less white on its tail.

== Distribution and habitat ==
The white-tailed jay is non-migratory and can be found from northwestern Peru to southwestern Ecuador. In Ecuador, it ranges as far north as the province of Guayas, down through El Oro and Loja. In Peru, it can be found as far south as La Libertad. It lives in several different types of semi-humid, semi-open woodlands throughout its range, such as mesquite woodlands and cactus steppe. Within these areas, it prefers to remain near thick patches of vegetation close to rivers and streams. In parts of Ecuador, it can be seen in cloud forests at higher elevations. It can be found from sea level up to 1,200 m (3,900 ft).

== Behaviour and ecology ==
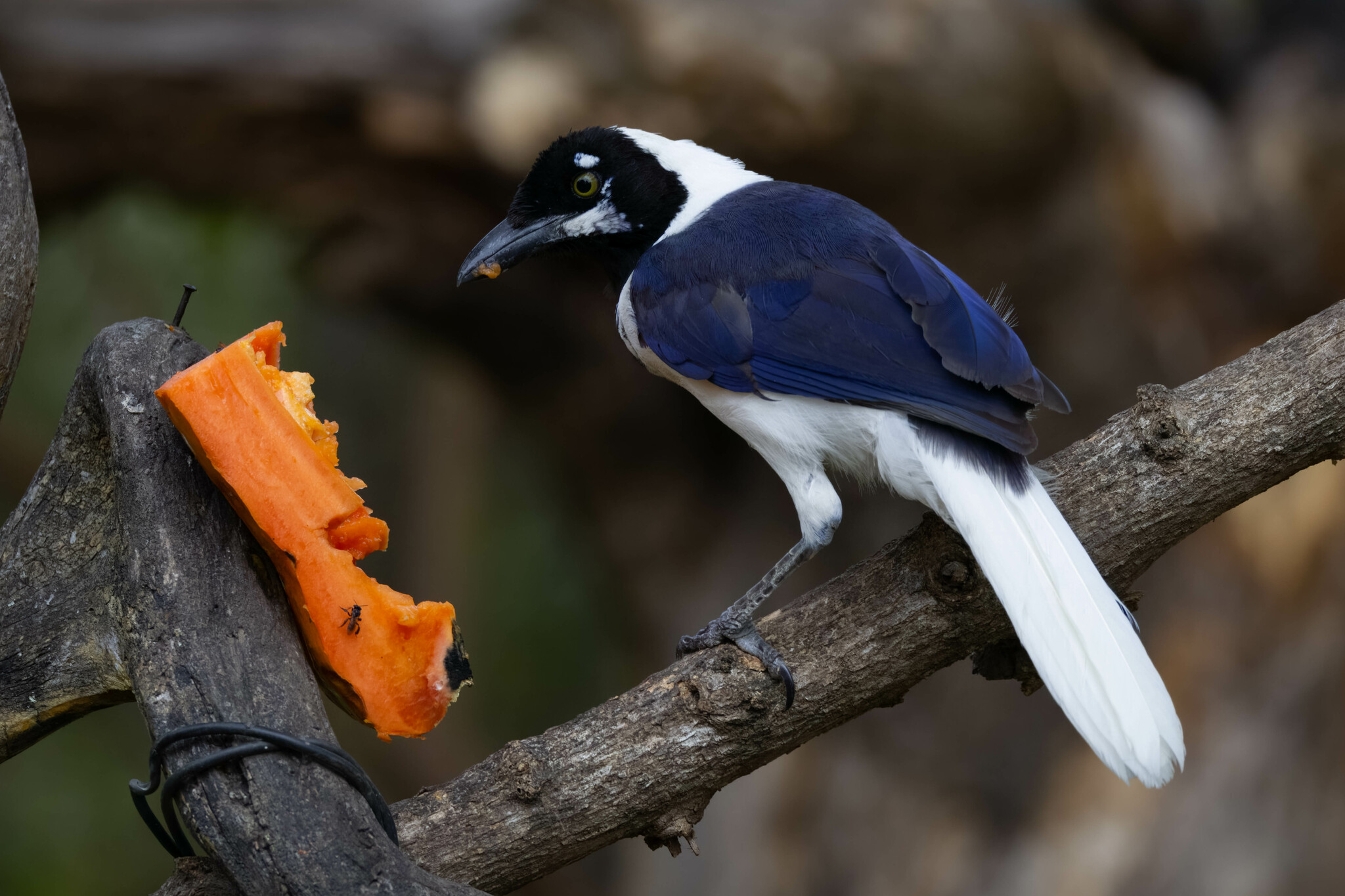
Feeding on papaya in Ecuador

=== Diet and feeding ===
The white-tailed jay feeds on insects, such as beetles and ants, and on seeds. It is also known to feed on eggs from other birds. It will approach human settlements and steal eggs from domestic ducks and chickens, and one pair has been observed raiding the nest of a pale-legged hornero. It also steals eggs from the endangered Peruvian plantcutter.

The white-tailed jay forages in flocks of up to ten individuals, but can also commonly be seen singly or in a pair. It forages throughout all levels of the forest; however, it can be found on the ground more often than other species in its genus. This is thought to be because of its habitat, as it prefers semi-open areas. It can also be found near human settlements and will forage through gardens. The white-tailed jay may be predated upon by the bicoloured hawk.

=== Breeding and nesting ===
Little is known about the breeding and nesting habits of the white-tailed jay. Adults have been observed carrying nesting material in February and March, and nests have been seen being built in tall trees close to villages. Breeding pairs likely nest alone, away from other white-tailed jays. Eggs are buff-coloured and heavily covered with brown, grey, and black spots.

== Conservation and status ==
The white-tailed jay is considered a species of least concern by the International Union for Conservation of Nature. While its exact population is unknown, it is fairly common within its range, although the population is believed to be decreasing. Certain regions have seen a notable decrease in population, such as the Loja Province in Ecuador. Because of the white-tailed jay's relatively restricted range, the primary threat to its survival is habitat destruction. There are currently no conservation plans in place for the white-tailed jay; however, it does occur within the Tumbesian region Endemic Bird Area and has been observed breeding there.
