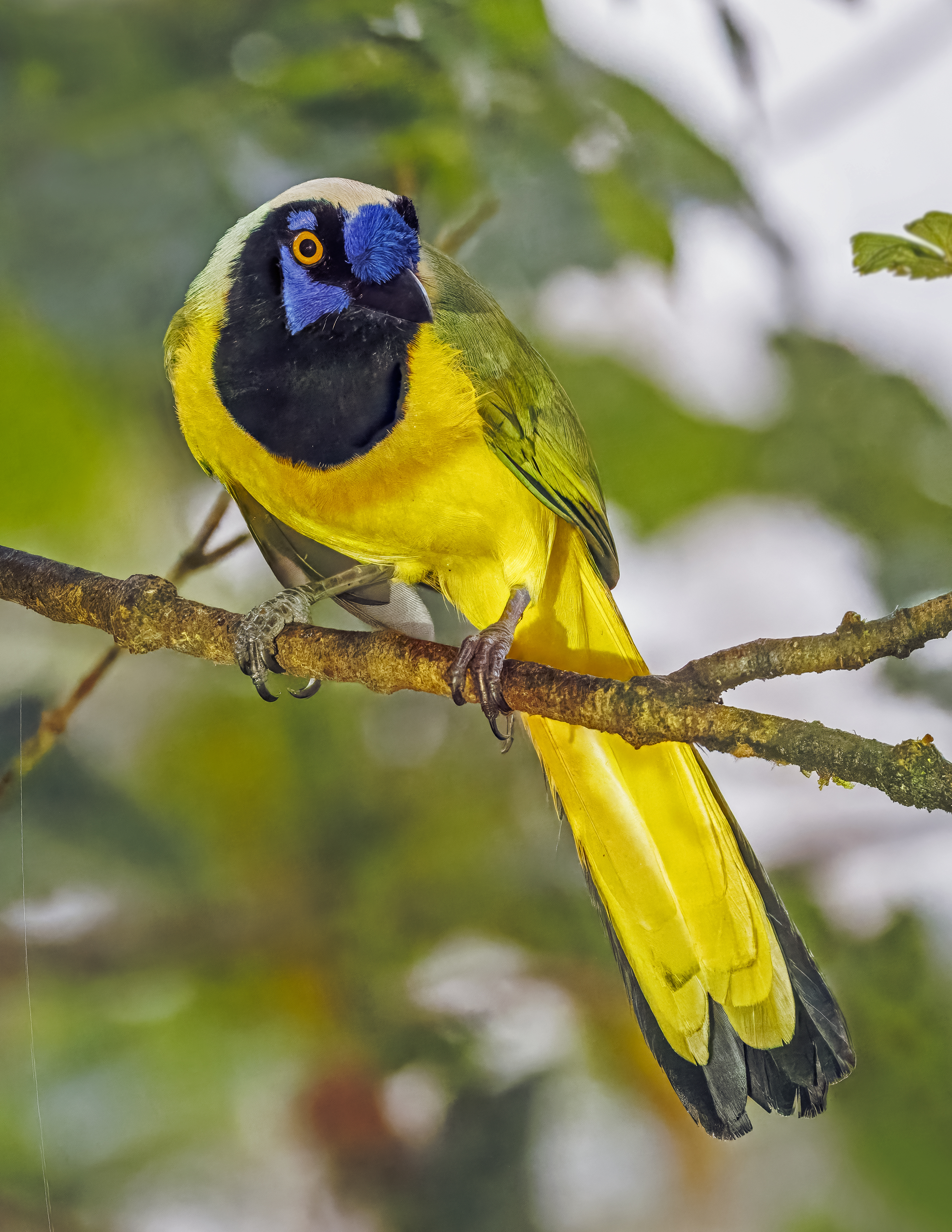
- C. y. yncas in Ecuador

Conservation status
- Least Concern (IUCN 3.1)

Scientific classification
- Kingdom: Animalia
- Phylum: Chordata
- Class: Aves
- Order: Passeriformes
- Family: Corvidae
- Genus: Cyanocorax
- Species: C. yncas

Binomial name
- Cyanocorax yncas (Boddaert, 1783)

= Inca jay =

Species of bird

The Inca jay (Cyanocorax yncas) is a bird species of the New World jays, which is native to the Andes of South America. It is widely known as querrequerre in Spanish, an onomatopoeic name derived from the bird's call. The species has a discontinuous distribution, with one population in the southern Texas, Mexico, Belize, Guatemala, Honduras and Nicaragua, and another extending in a narrow band from Venezuela through Colombia, Ecuador and Peru to Bolivia. Its habitat includes forest, savanna and shrubland as well as human-inhabited areas, at altutudes from sea level to 3,500 metres (11,480 ft).

== Taxonomy ==
The Inca jay was described by the French polymath Georges-Louis Leclerc, Comte de Buffon in 1775 in his Histoire Naturelle des Oiseaux. The bird was also illustrated in a hand-colored plate engraved by François-Nicolas Martinet in the Planches Enluminées D'Histoire Naturelle which was produced under the supervision of Edme-Louis Daubenton to accompany Buffon's text. Neither the plate caption nor Buffon's description included a scientific name but in 1783 the Dutch naturalist Pieter Boddaert coined the binomial name Corvus yncas in his catalogue of the Planches Enluminées. Buffon's specimen came from Peru; in 1953 the American ornithologist John Todd Zimmer restricted the type location to Chilpes, Department of Junín. The Inca jay is now one of 17 species placed in the genus Cyanocorax that was introduced by the German zoologist Friedrich Boie in 1826. The name of the genus is from Ancient Greek kuanos "dark-blue" and korakos "raven". The specific epithet yncas is from the Incas, the inhabitants of Peru in pre-Columbian America.

Five subspecies are accepted:

- C. y. galeatus (Ridgway, 1900) – Found in western Colombia. Similar to C. y. yncas but with a larger crest.
- C. y. cyanodorsalis Dubois, AJC, 1874 – East of the Andes in Colombia and northwest Venezuela. Smaller that C. y. geleatus but with a dark blue crest, white stripe on the forehead, blue crown and neck, dark green back, and darker legs.
- C. y. guatimalensis (Bonaparte, 1850) – Found in mountainous region in northern Venezuela. Similar to C. y. cyandorsalis, but with shorter crest, less blue overall, and thinner white stripe on forehead. Brownish legs and irises.
- C. y. yncas (Boddaert, 1783) – Found in southwestern Colombia to eastern Ecuador and Peru, into central Bolivia. Nominate subspecies.
- C. y. longirostris (Carriker, 1933) – Found along the Marañon Valley in north Peru. Similar to C. y. yncas but larger.
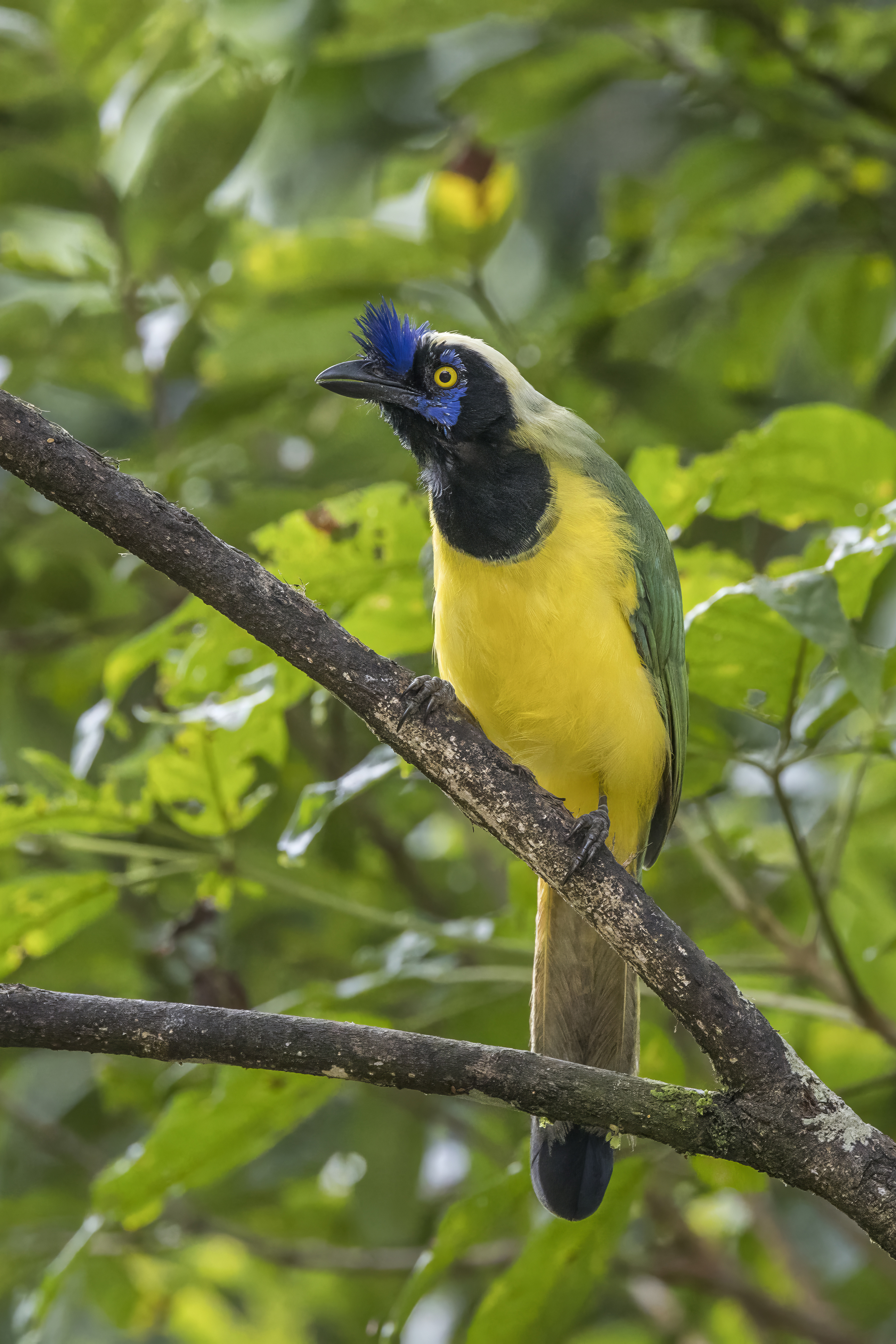
C. y. galeatus in Colombia

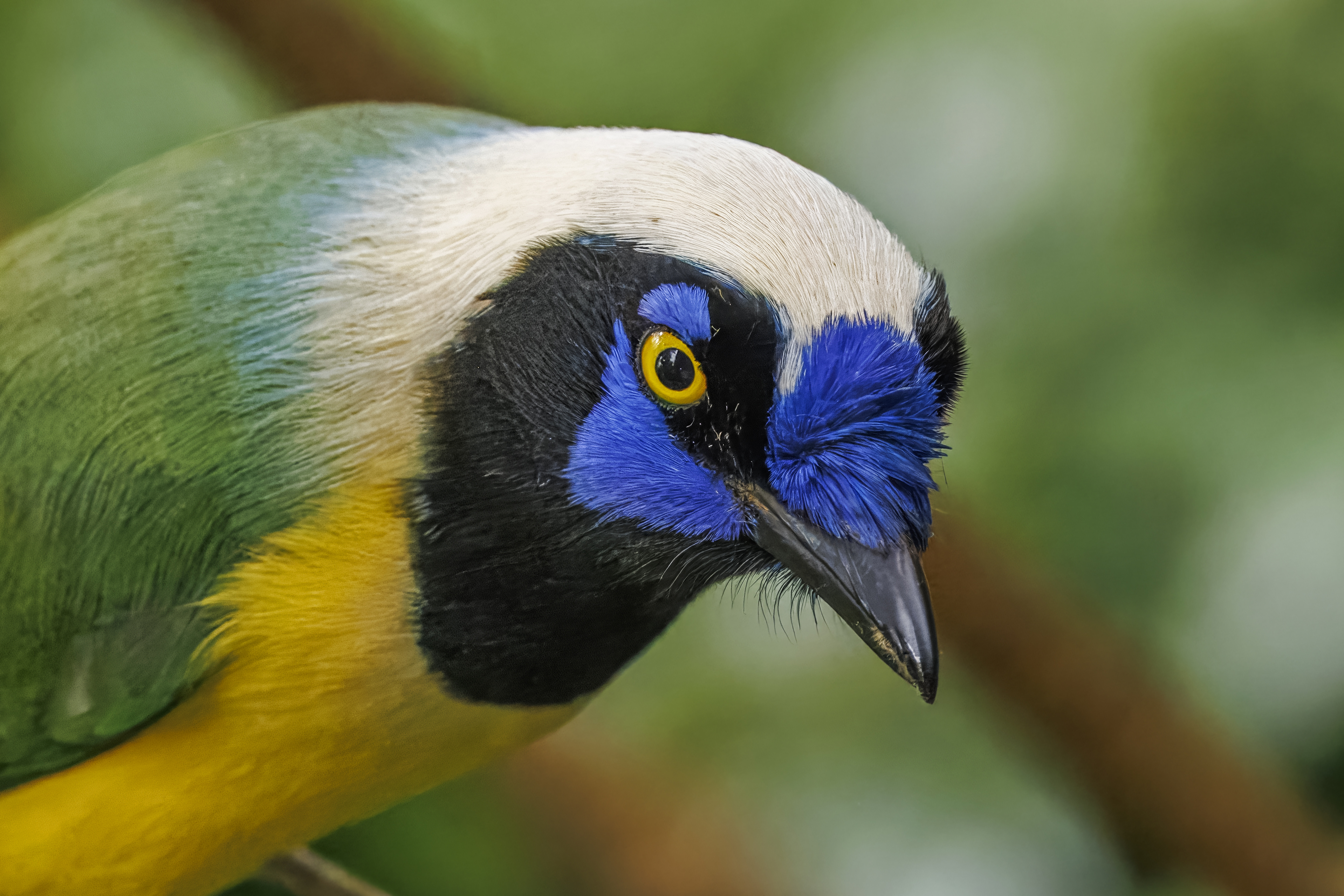
C. y. yncas in Ecuador

Some ornithologists treat the green jay of North America and the Inca jay as conspecific and with C. yncas luxuosus as the green jay and C. yncas yncas as the Inca jay. A 2010 mitochondrial DNA study found that there were clear genetic differences that support them being separate species, although it indicated that further research was required to confirm the findings.

The following cladogram (simplified from the 2010 mitochondrial DNA study) shows the relationship between species in the genus Cyanocorax.

- - Inca jay (C. yncas)
  - White-tailed jay (C. mystacalis)
  - - - - - - - - Cayenne jay (C. cayanus)
              - - Plush-crested jay (C. chrysops)
                - White-naped jay (C. cyanopogon)
            - - Azure-naped jay (C. heilprini)
              - Black-chested jay (C. affinis)
          - Tufted jay (C. dickeyi)
        - - Bushy-crested jay (C. melanocyaneus)
          - - Yucatan jay (C. yucatanicus)
            - - San Blas jay (C. sanblasianus)
              - Purplish-backed jay (C. beecheii)

== Description ==
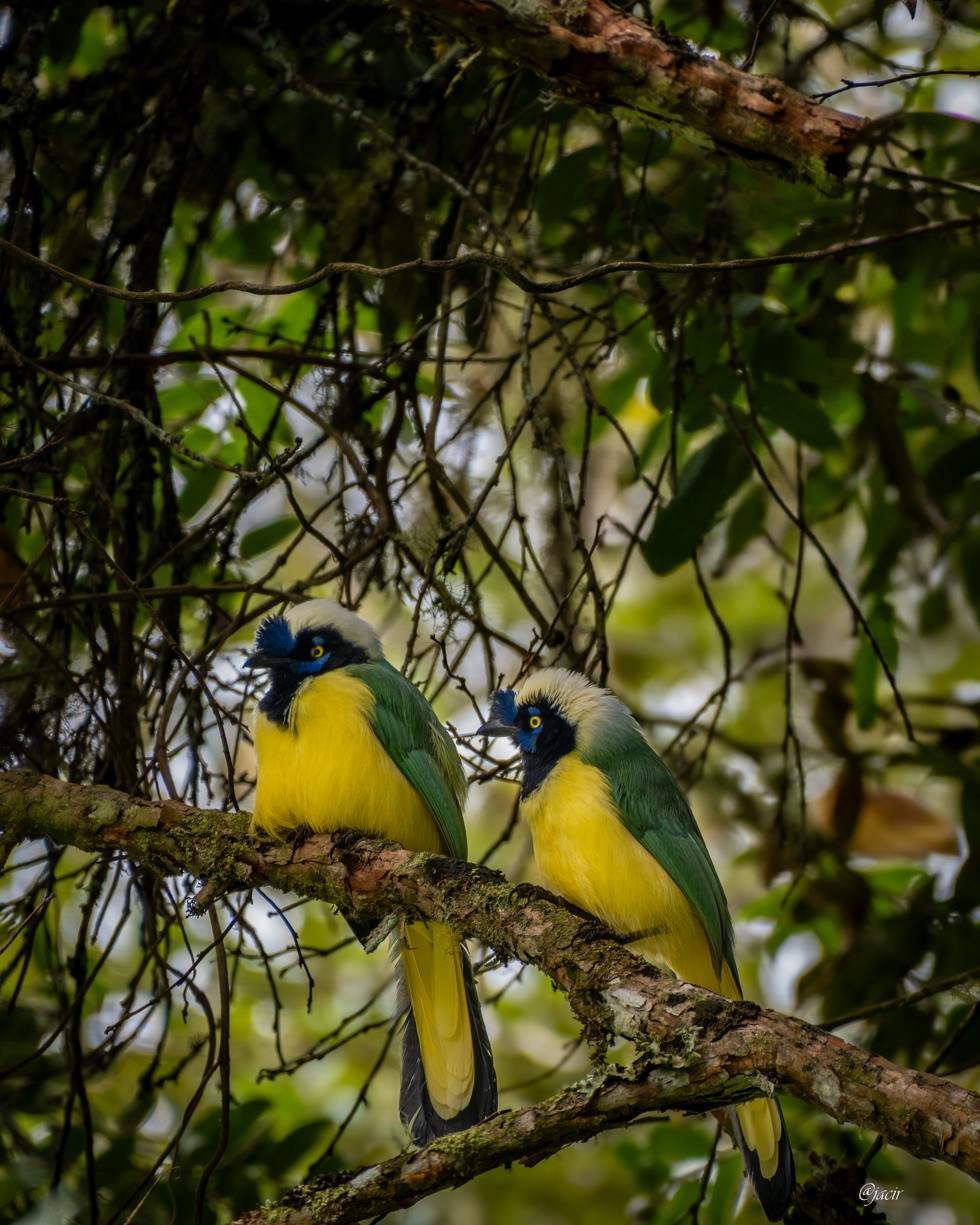
Couple of Incas Jay in Colombia.

The Inca jay is 29.5–30.5 cm (11.6–12.0 in) in length. The crown can appear mostly white, with blue limited to the frontal crest and nape. A black bib forms a broad band up to the sides of the head as well as a stripe through the eye line and one above it. The breast and underparts typically are bright yellow. The upper parts are rich green. The color of the iris is bright yellow.

=== Voice ===
As with most of the typical jays, this species has a very extensive voice repertoire. The bird's most common call makes a rassh-rassh-rassh sound, but many other unusual notes also occur. One of the most distinctive calls sounds like an alarm bell.

== Distribution and habitat ==
The range extends southwards in the Andes from the Colombia and Venezuela through Ecuador, Peru, and Bolivia.

== Behavior and ecology ==
=== Breeding ===
Inca jays usually build a nest in a tree or a thorny bush or thicket, and the female lays three to five eggs. Only the female incubates, but both parents take care of the young. In Venezuela, they have been observed being victims of nest parasitism by giant cowbirds.

=== Feeding ===
Their basic diet consists of arthropods, vertebrates, seeds, and fruit.
