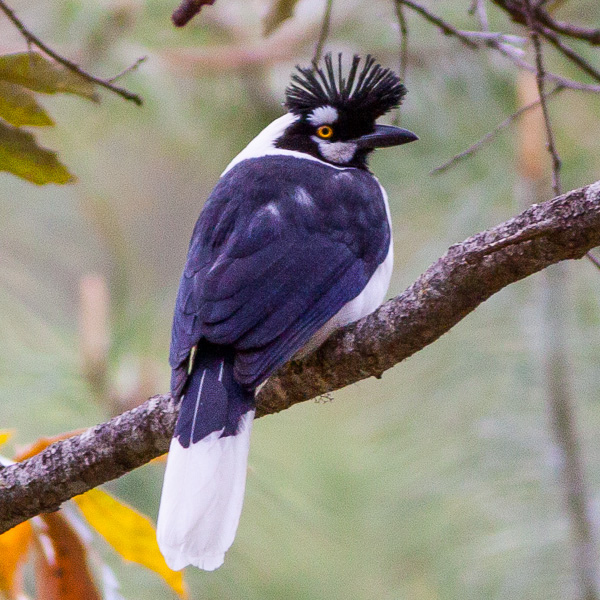
- In Sinaloa, Mexico

Conservation status
- Near Threatened (IUCN 3.1)

Scientific classification
- Kingdom: Animalia
- Phylum: Chordata
- Class: Aves
- Order: Passeriformes
- Family: Corvidae
- Genus: Cyanocorax
- Species: C. dickeyi

Binomial name
- Cyanocorax dickeyi Moore, RT, 1935
- Distribution of the tufted jay Year-round

= Tufted jay =

Species of bird in the family Corvidae

The tufted jay (Cyanocorax dickeyi), also known as the painted jay and Dickey's jay, is a species of bird in the crow family Corvidae. It is endemic to a small area of the Sierra Madre Occidental in the Mexican states of Sinaloa, Durango, and Nayarit. A distinctive large jay, it has a prominent dark crest on its head; purplish blue back, wings, and face; a white spot above the eye and on the cheek; white undersides; and a partially white tail. Its typical call is a quick, four-note vocalization.

The relationship between the tufted jay and other members of the genus Cyanocorax has been a subject of interest since the species was first described in 1935. Because of the visual similarities between the tufted jay and the white-tailed jay, the two were thought by some to be closely related. A 2010 mitochondrial DNA study has shown that the tufted jay is most closely related to a group of South American jays, despite their ranges being separated by over 2,000 km (1,200 mi). They are likely descended from an ancestral jay which ranged throughout Central and South America.

The tufted jay lives in pine-oak forests, often remaining high in the canopy. Its diet consists primarily of berries and fruit, and to a lesser extent insects such as katydids. It forms social flocks centred around a single breeding pair, with some flocks remaining together over several generations. The tufted jay's breeding season starts in late March, with a clutch of two to five eggs being laid in a nest that is cooperatively built by members of the flock. The tufted jay is considered near threatened by the International Union for Conservation of Nature (IUCN). Its population is decreasing, with an estimated 10,000–20,000 mature individuals in the wild. The primary threat to its survival is habitat destruction due to agricultural expansion and deforestation due to logging and narcotic cultivation.

== Taxonomy and systematics ==
The tufted jay, also known as the painted jay or Dickey's jay, was first described by the ornithologist Robert Thomas Moore in 1935 based on specimens collected on November 7, 1934, near Santa Lucía, Sinaloa, in Mexico. Due to its very limited range, the species was not discovered during previous collection expeditions, despite them passing within 56 km (35 mi) of its habitat. Moore placed it in the genus Cyanocorax and gave it the species name Cyanocorax dickeyi, with the specific name being in honour of the ornithologist Donald Ryder Dickey. The tufted jay has no recognized subspecies.

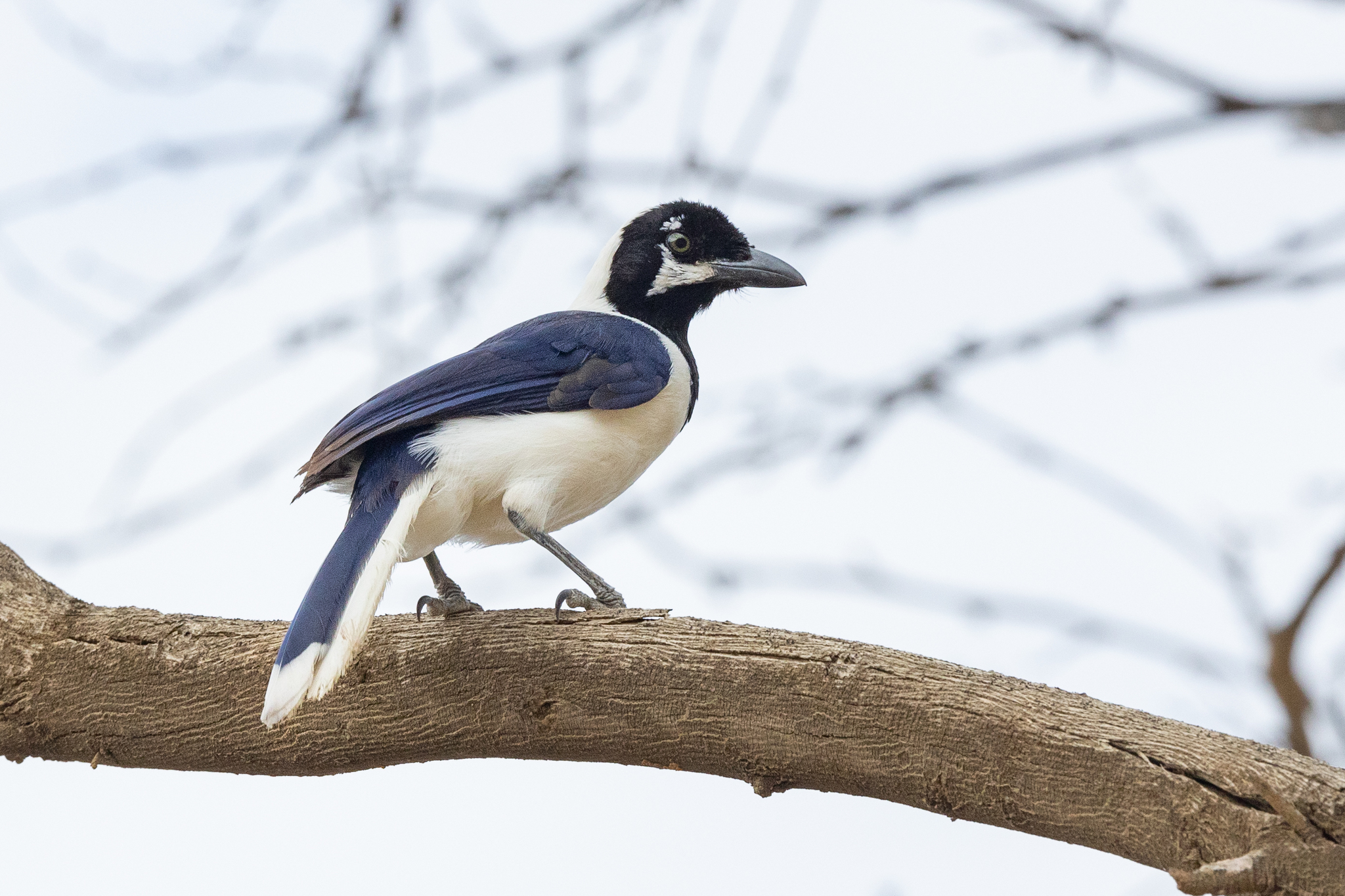
The white-tailed jay (pictured) and the tufted jay have been incorrectly considered the same species by some ornithologists.

In his initial description of the tufted jay, Moore noted that its geographically closest relative in the genus Cyanocorax was found in Costa Rica, but that it most closely resembled the white-tailed jay found in Ecuador over 4,800 km (3,000 mi) away. This indicated that the tufted jay and white-tailed jay descended from a common ancestor that once lived throughout Central and South America. This is a commonly held theory by others who have studied the tufted jay. The ornithologist Dean Amadon proposed that the tufted jay was most closely related to its geographically closest relative, the black-chested jay of Costa Rica, and that its similarity to the white-tailed jay was the result of convergent evolution.

These similarities led some researchers to hypothesize that the two must be more closely related than their ranges would suggest. In 1969, the ornithologist John William Hardy discussed a theory that the tufted jay had descended from a flock of white-tailed jays that had accidentally been brought to Mexico by a storm, noting that a similar phenomenon happened to a group of San Blas jays in 1937. In 1979, ornithologist Paul Haemig elaborated on a hypothesis by Jean Théodore Delacour, published in 1944, that the two jays were actually the same species. Haemig said that the colouration differences between the two jays could be explained by Gloger's rule, and that crest size was a "very plastic character in jays" and was of little significance when determining if the two were the same species. He proposed that the white-tailed jay had been brought to Mexico by trade between pre-Columbian societies, and that the tufted jay was descended from that population. A 1989 study of the morphological characteristics of the two species seemed to support these hypotheses by proposing that the two were sister species. In 2010, a mitochondrial DNA study of the genus Cyanocorax demonstrated that the tufted jay and white-tailed jay were not sister species, and that the tufted jay is sister to a clade (a group of species with a common ancestor) formed by the white-naped, Cayenne, plush-crested, azure-naped, and black-chested jays, all of which are found in South America. This study concluded that the most likely explanation for the geographical gap between the tufted jay and its South American relatives was a widely distributed common ancestor.

The following cladogram (simplified from the 2010 study) shows the relationship between species in the Cyanocorax genus.

- - Inca jay (C. yncas)
  - White-tailed jay (C. mystacalis)
  - - - - - - - - Cayenne jay (C. cayanus)
              - - Plush-crested jay (C. chrysops)
                - White-naped jay (C. cyanopogon)
            - - Azure-naped jay (C. heilprini)
              - Black-chested jay (C. affinis)
          - Tufted jay (C. dickeyi)
        - - Bushy-crested jay (C. melanocyaneus)
          - - Yucatan jay (C. yucatanicus)
            - - San Blas jay (C. sanblasianus)
              - Purplish-backed jay (C. beecheii)

== Description ==
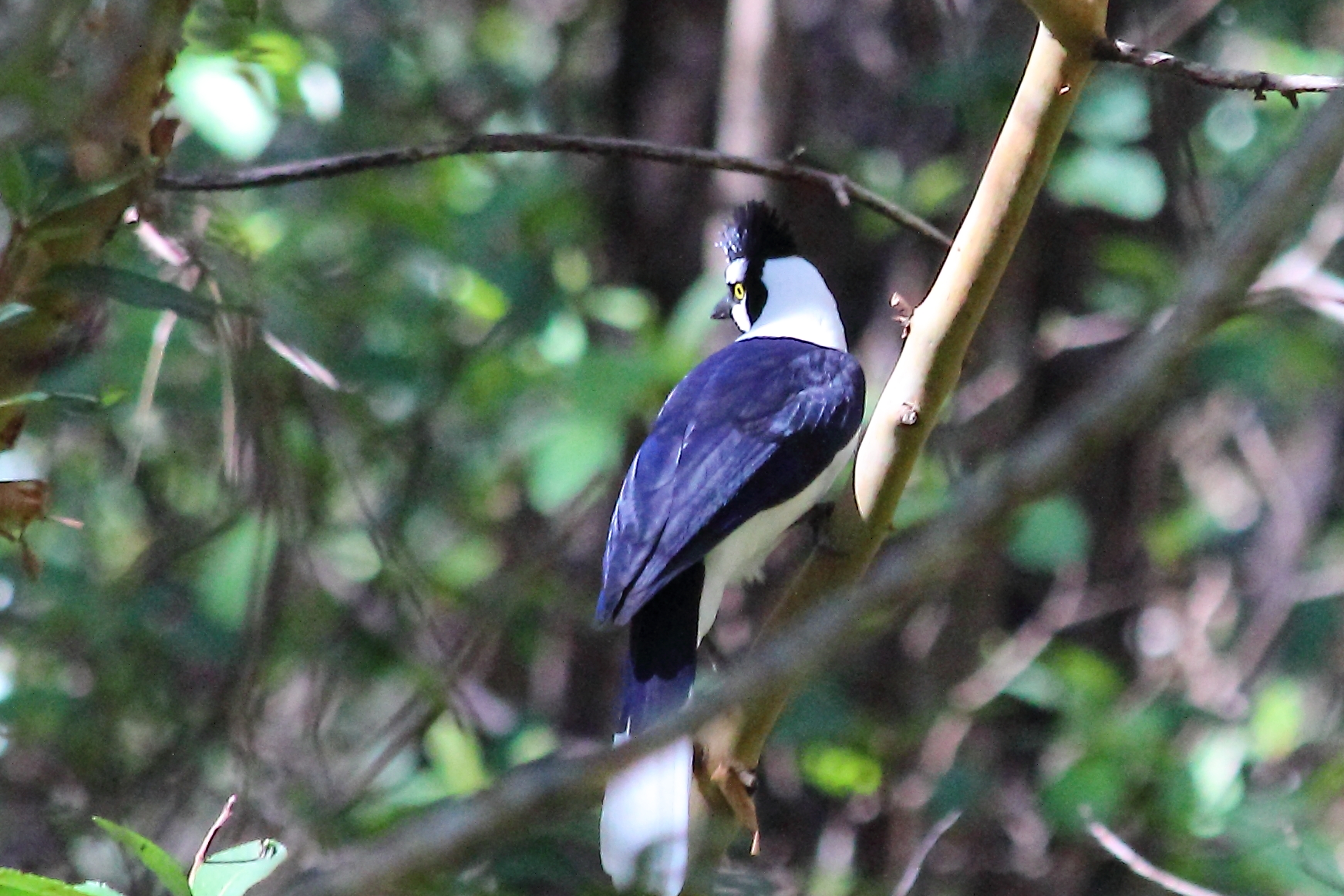
Tufted jays have purplish blue backs and wings.

The tufted jay is a distinctive bird within its range. It has a crest of black feathers on its head, fading to dark blue at the base. Its face is mostly black to dark blue with white spots above the eyes and white cheeks. It has a white nape and belly. The back and wings are a purplish blue which extends partway down the tail, transitioning to white about halfway down. The beak and legs are both black, and it has bright yellow irises. Immature birds have shorter crests, lack the white spot above their eyes, and have bright blue cheeks and brown irises. This plumage remains until the moult which occurs in their second year. The base of their beak is flesh-coloured, but this fades to black a few months after hatching. There is no difference in plumage or colouration between males and females. The tufted jay's flight is described as "buoyant", and it constantly flaps its wings during flight. The average life span of a tufted jay is not known.

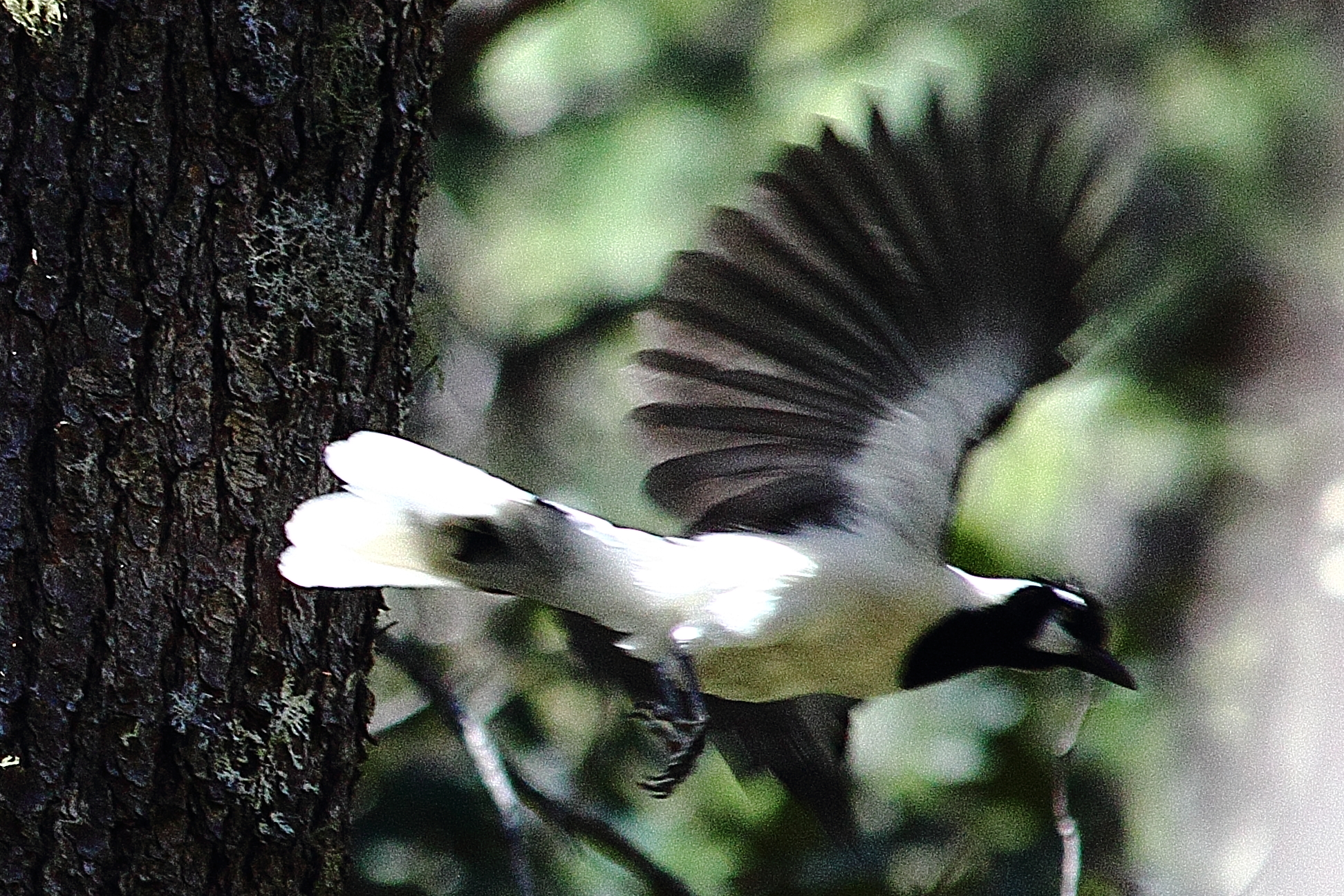
Tufted jay in flight

The tufted jay is a large jay, measuring between 35.5–38 cm (14.0–15.0 in), and with males being slightly larger than females. A 1935 study found that the males had an average wing length of 180.4 mm (7.10 in), an average tail length of 171.3 mm (6.74 in), an average beak length of 23.5 mm (0.93 in), and an average tarsus length of 45.3 mm (1.78 in). Females had an average wing length of 177.1 mm (6.97 in), an average tail length of 164.2 mm (6.46 in), an average beak length of 23.2 mm (0.91 in), and an average tarsus length of 45.9 mm (1.81 in). The tufted jay weighs on average 181 g (6.4 oz), although it is unknown if this varies between sexes.

The tufted jay somewhat visually similar to the black-throated magpie-jay, although the magpie-jay is bluer, has a larger crest, and a significantly longer tail. It is also overall more bright in colouration than the tufted jay. The tufted jay is also similar to the white-tailed jay, although their ranges do not overlap. Compared to the white-tailed jay, the tufted jay has a larger crest, no white on its outer wings, and more white on its tail.

=== Vocalizations ===
The tufted jay has several calls, with the most common being a rapid, four-note call transcribed as either rak, chuck, chen, or ca. This call is made by flock members when feeding and by nesting females, and a higher-pitched variation is used as a mobbing call. When perched next to other tufted jays, individuals may make a nasal aaagh call. When guarding a nest, males make a tuk or tst call. The tufted jay is also known to mimic the calls of the blue mockingbird and the great-tailed grackle.

Prior to copulation, breeding pairs of tufted jays make a duet call. This call is described as a chering-chering followed by a metallic bring. One member of the pair begins the call and it is immediately repeated by the other. These duets are repeated roughly every 20 seconds, with a soft call described as a "whisper" interspersed between repetitions. It is not certain whether the male or female begins the call. These duets last roughly 12 minutes.

== Distribution and habitat ==
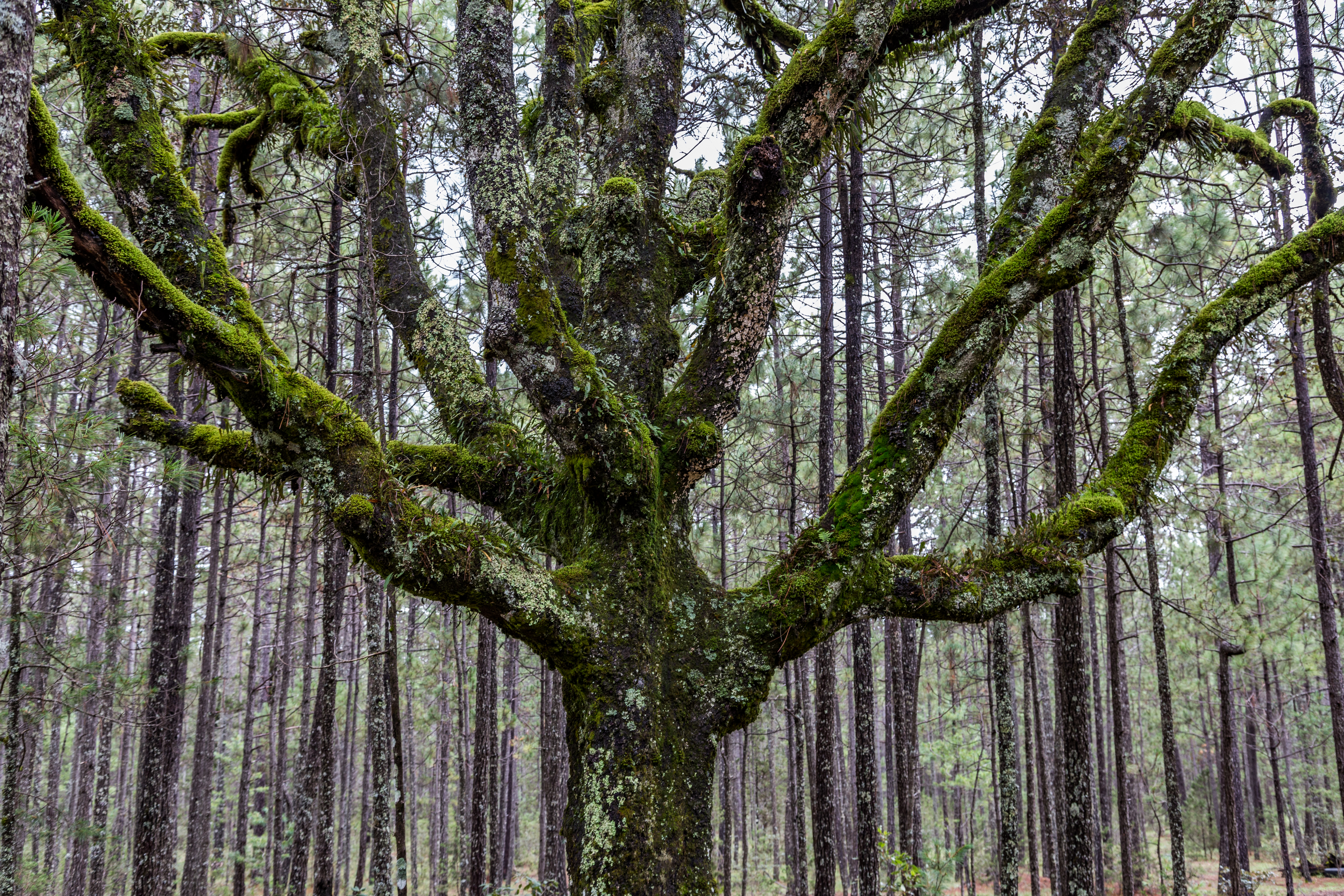
The tufted jay can be found in pine-oak forests within Sierra Madre Occidental.

The tufted jay is endemic to Mexico and is only found in a limited range within the Sierra Madre Occidental, in an area of roughly 193 km × 32 km (120 mi × 20 mi). Within this mountain range, they can be found in eastern Sinaloa, western Durango, and northern Nayarit. This species is most often found at elevations of 1,500–2,000 m (4,900–6,600 ft), but has been found as low as 1,200 m (3,900 ft) and as high as 2,500 m (8,200 ft).

The tufted jay inhabits forests throughout its range. During the non-breeding season, they are more common in higher elevation pine-oak forests. In the breeding season, they can commonly be found in ravines near water sources. They can sometimes be found at higher elevations into the Mexican Plateau or areas where logging has occurred. Tufted jays are almost always near tree-tops and within the forest canopy, and are rarely seen on the ground.

== Behaviour and ecology ==
=== Feeding ===
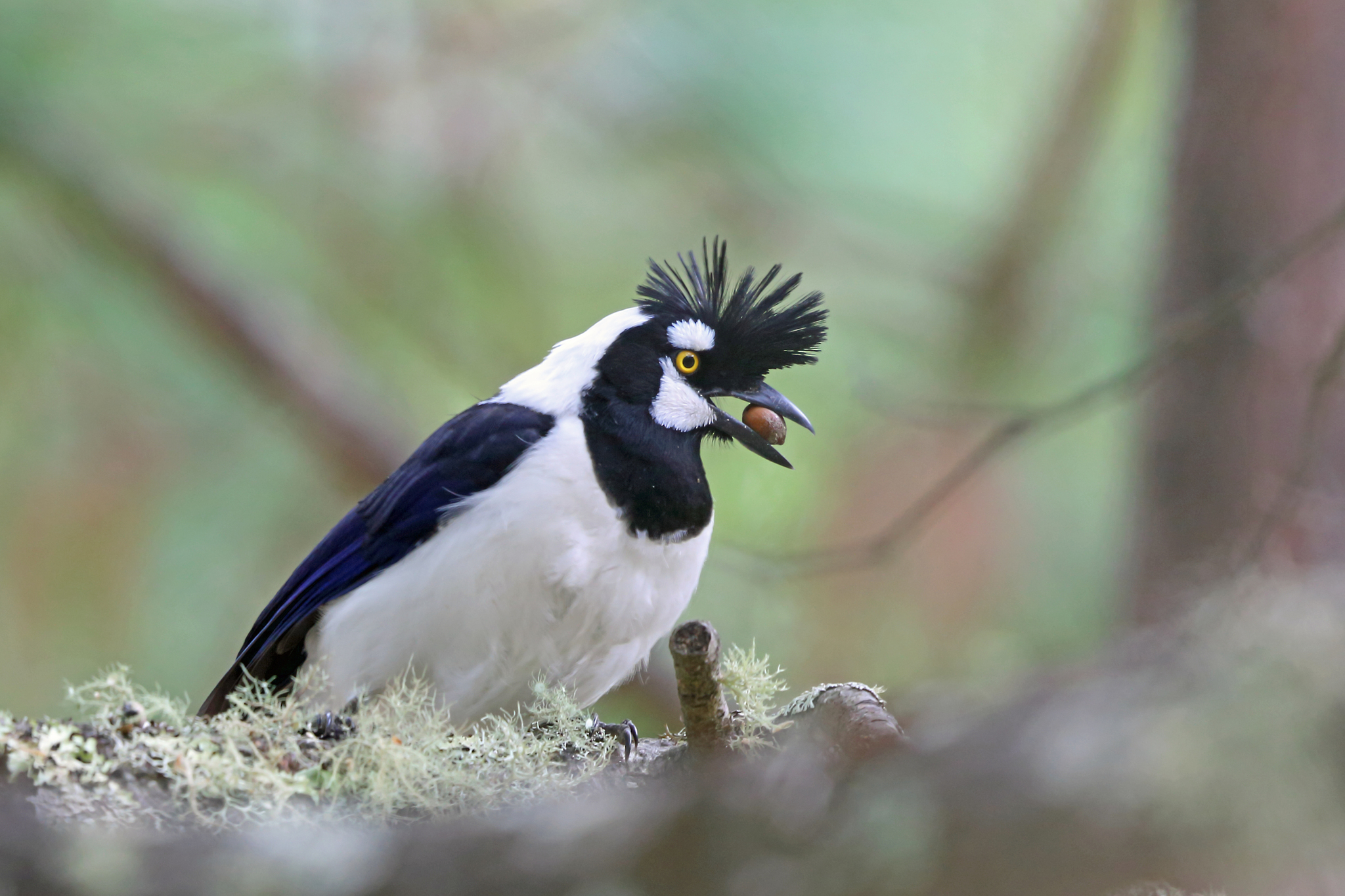
A tufted jay eating an acorn

Tufted jays eat fruits, acorns, and arthropods. The bulk of their diet, roughly 70%, consists of plant matter, including blackberries, nuts, acorns, and the fruit from Peltostigma plants. The remaining 30% of their diet is composed of katydids, beetles, wasps, and other insects. Tufted jays have been observed eating eggs which have been stolen from other birds' nests.

Tufted jays forage for food in flocks during the non-breeding season, breaking up into smaller foraging groups in late March as the breeding season begins. They use a variety of methods to access food; they will often perch on a branch and pry, pull, or hammer at food sources. In circumstances where a branch cannot support their weight, they hang from a higher branch and reach down, or they may briefly hover in front of the food source to access it. They also cache food, and will sometimes forage through plant litter on the ground.

During the breeding season, flocks work cooperatively to feed the nesting female. Flock members make frequent trips from their foraging area back to the nest. Nesting females may make a begging call and flap their wings when food is brought to them.

=== Socialization and territoriality ===
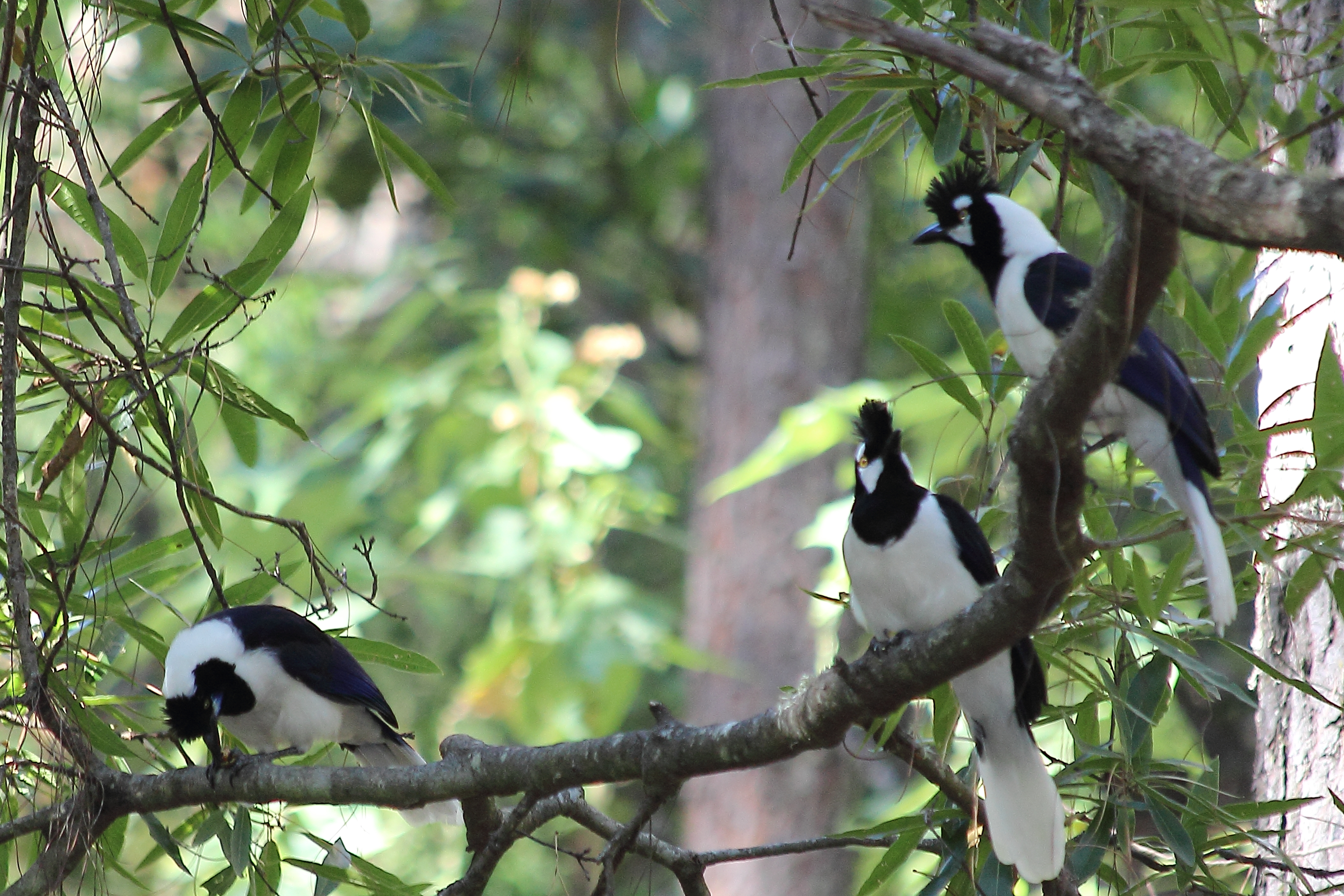
Flock of tufted jays

The tufted jay is a social bird, living in flocks of 4–16 individuals. The size of the flock will change throughout the year, being larger during the non-breeding season and smaller during breeding. Flocks typically consist of a single breeding pair, other secondary adults, and several juvenile birds. Juvenile males who disperse from the flock do so at around 13–18 months of age. Groups of tufted jays stay together over the course of a year, and some last over a number of generations. Different flocks tend to be situated near to each other, but have territories which do not often overlap. When territoriality does occur, it is typically centered on areas used for breeding and foraging.

The tufted jay has also shown limited hostility towards other species. Groups of Steller's jays sometimes follow tufted jay flocks, with the two species ignoring each other, although a tufted jay may dive at a Steller's jay if it approaches a nest site or while the tufted jay is foraging. Conversely, other species such as white-eared hummingbirds and Aztec thrushes have been observed mobbing tufted jays.

=== Breeding and nesting ===
The breeding season for tufted jays starts in late March, and each flock contains only a single breeding pair. Nests are built cooperatively by the breeding female, second-year juveniles, and other females in the flock. They are built 5–15 m (16–49 ft) high in trees and are approximately 41 cm (16 in) in diameter and 6 cm (2.4 in) deep. The nest is made of sticks, with the nest cup consisting of roots and smaller branches. Females will sit in the nest even prior to any eggs being laid.

Eggs are laid in April or May, with the clutch averaging two to five eggs. They are an olive colour with brown speckles, and measure 36–38 mm (1.4–1.5 in) long and 24–25.4 mm (0.94–1.00 in) wide. Only the female will incubate the eggs, while the male and other members of the flock provide food for the nesting female. The incubation period lasts 18–19 days, and hatchlings remain in the nest for roughly 24 days. Hatchlings are altricial (immature and helpless at birth) and born without feathers. The cooperative feeding of the nesting female extends to the hatchlings, with the flock passing food to the nesting female, who then passes it to the hatchlings. It is not known at what age tufted jays start breeding.

== Conservation and status ==
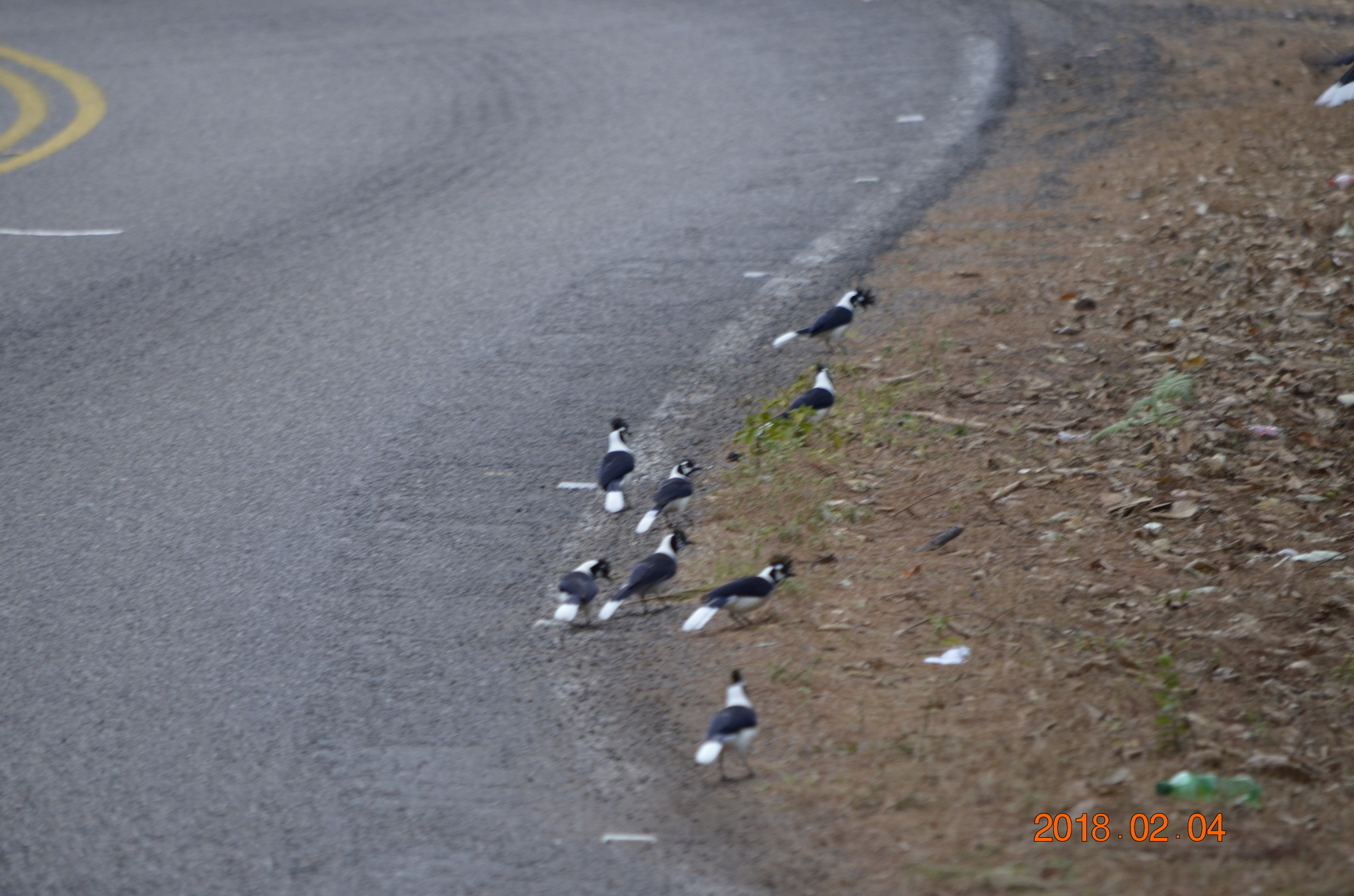
A flock of tufted jays foraging next to a road

The tufted jay is listed as near threatened by the International Union for Conservation of Nature (IUCN). As of 2020, their population is considered to be decreasing, with 10,000–20,000 mature individuals. Since the population of the tufted jay is relatively restricted geographically, the primary threats to its survival are habitat destruction due to agricultural expansion, deforestation from logging and the cultivation of narcotics, and forest fires. Habitat fragmentation caused by road construction is also thought to pose a threat. The tufted jay is known to be hunted or killed by humans, such as those involved in narcotic cultivation or children. Drought also presents a threat to the tufted jay as it results in a lack of food sources. Climate change is likely to result in future prolonged droughts, which could cause a significant decrease in the tufted jay's population. Some water sources used by groups of tufted jays have also been destroyed by human activity.

While there are no active conservation plans in place for the tufted jay, they are considered endangered by the Mexican government, and at great risk of extinction by Partners in Flight. Since 2004, the El Palmito ejido in Sinaloa has a community conservation plan in place. A large number of tufted jays are found near here, and the conservation plan aims to encourage ecotourism and education while limiting logging activities.
