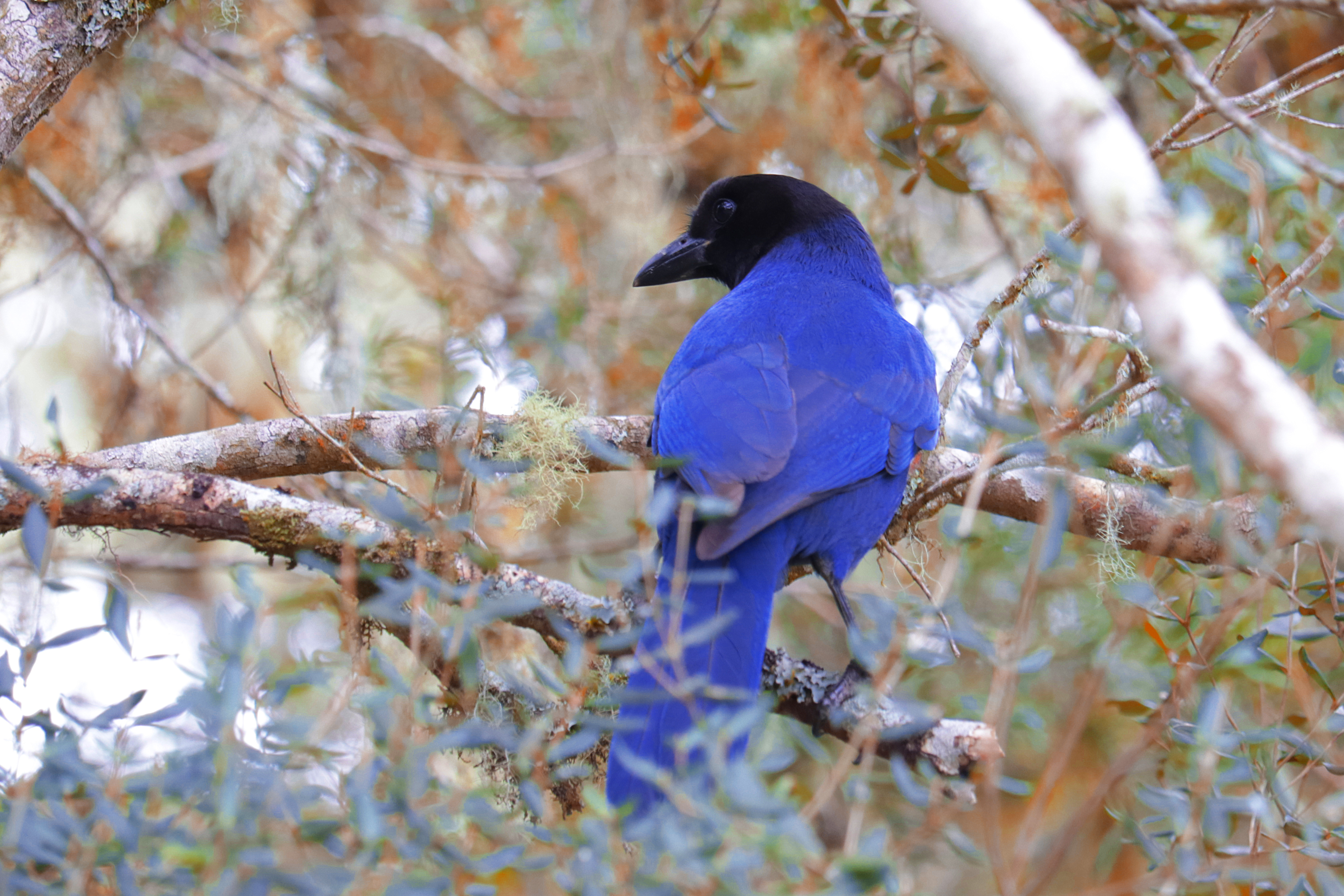
- In Aparados da Serra National Park, Brazil

Conservation status
- Near Threatened (IUCN 3.1)

Scientific classification
- Kingdom: Animalia
- Phylum: Chordata
- Class: Aves
- Order: Passeriformes
- Family: Corvidae
- Genus: Cyanocorax
- Species: C. coeruleus

Binomial name
- Cyanocorax coeruleus (Vieillot, 1818)
- Approximate distribution in green

Synonyms
- Cyanocorax caeruleus (orth. err.)

= Azure jay =

Species of bird

The azure jay (Cyanocorax coeruleus) (Brazilian Portuguese: gralha-azul) is a Near Threatened species of passeriform bird in the family Corvidae, the crows and jays. It is found in Argentina, Brazil, and possibly Paraguay and Uruguay.

== Taxonomy and systematics ==
The azure jay was originally described in 1818 as Pica coerulea (with an œ ligature), identifying it as a magpie. With its transfer to the genus Cyanocorax, its specific epithet ending was changed to the masculine "-us" to agree with the gender of this name. However, taxonomic systems do not agree on its spelling. AviList and BirdLife International's Handbook of the Birds of the World use coeruleus to match the original spelling. The IOC, the Clements taxonomy, and the independent South American Classification Committee (SACC) currently spell it caeruleus. This article uses the former spelling.

The azure jay is monotypic. Some authors treat the azure jay and the purplish jay (C. cyanomelas) as a superspecies.

== Description ==
The azure jay is 38 to 40 cm (15 to 16 in) long; one individual weighed 272 g (9.6 oz). The sexes have the same plumage that includes a short bushy crest on the forecrown. Adults have a sooty or black head, neck, and upper breast. The rest of their plumage is somewhat variable, with cobalt-blue, purplish blue, and greenish blue individuals. They have a dark brown iris, a black bill, and black legs and feet.

== Distribution and habitat ==
The azure jay is found in Brazil from southern São Paulo south through Paraná, Santa Catarina, and Rio Grande do Sul almost to Uruguay. Its range continues into the northeastern Argentinian provinces of Formosa, Chaco, Corrientes, and Misiones. Most sources include eastern Paraguay in its range. There are historical records there whose identification is disputed and sight records from the late 1900s. The SACC has no records in that country but includes Uruguay in its range. BirdLife International includes Uruguay and questions its presence in Paraguay.

The azure jay inhabits humid evergreen forest, especially that dominated by Araucaria angustifolia. In elevation it ranges from sea level to 1,000 m (3,300 ft).

== Behavior ==
=== Movement ===
The azure jay is a year-round resident.

=== Feeding ===
The azure jay is omnivorous but its diet has not been fully described. However, it appears to feed heavily on Araucaria angustifolia seeds, and plays an important role in its seed dispersal. It also is known to feed on other fruit, arthropods, small mammals, and eggs, and has been observed scavenging from a fresh cow carcass. It forages in small flocks that sometimes include plush-crested jays (C. chryops).

=== Breeding ===
The azure jay's breeding season spans October to March. It is believed to be a cooperative breeder. Its nest is a flat cup made from twigs lined with softer roots. The clutch is four eggs that are greenish blue with gray and brown spots. Nothing else is known about the species' breeding biology.

=== Vocalization ===
The azure jay has a wide variety of vocalizations, the most prominent of which is shrill and is written "Kiaahh- kiaahh- kiaahh".

== Status ==
The IUCN originally in 1988 assessed the azure jay as Threatened and since 1994 as Near Threatened. Its population size is not known and is believed to be decreasing. "Agricultural conversion and deforestation for mining and plantation production historically threaten its habitat, with current key threats from urbanisation, industrialisation, agricultural expansion, colonisation and associated road-building". It is considered "frequent to uncommon" in Brazil.
