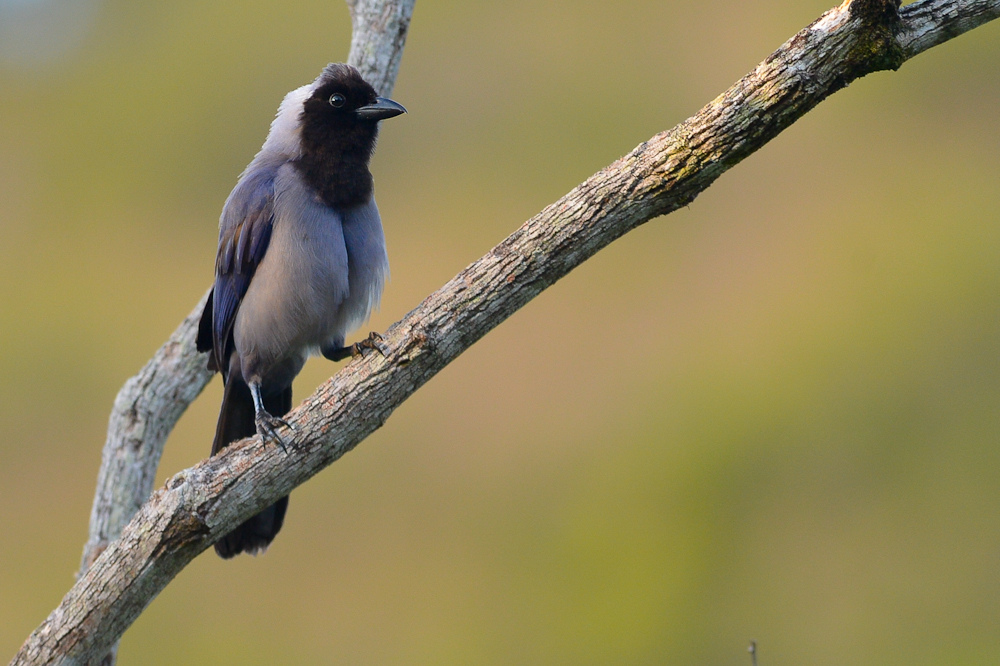
- In northern Roraima, Brazil

Conservation status
- Least Concern (IUCN 3.1)

Scientific classification
- Kingdom: Animalia
- Phylum: Chordata
- Class: Aves
- Order: Passeriformes
- Family: Corvidae
- Genus: Cyanocorax
- Species: C. violaceus

Binomial name
- Cyanocorax violaceus Du Bus de Gisignies, 1847
- Approximate distribution

= Violaceous jay =

Species of bird

The violaceous jay (Cyanocorax violaceus) is a species of bird in the family Corvidae, the crows and jays. It is found in Bolivia, Brazil, Colombia, Ecuador, Peru, Venezuela, and possibly Guyana.

== Taxonomy and systematics ==
The violaceous jay was originally described in 1847 as Cyanocorax violaceus, its current binomial.

The violaceous jay has two subspecies, the nominate C. v. violaceus (Du Bus de Gisignies, 1847) and C. v. pallidus (Zimmer, JT & Phelps, WH, 1944).

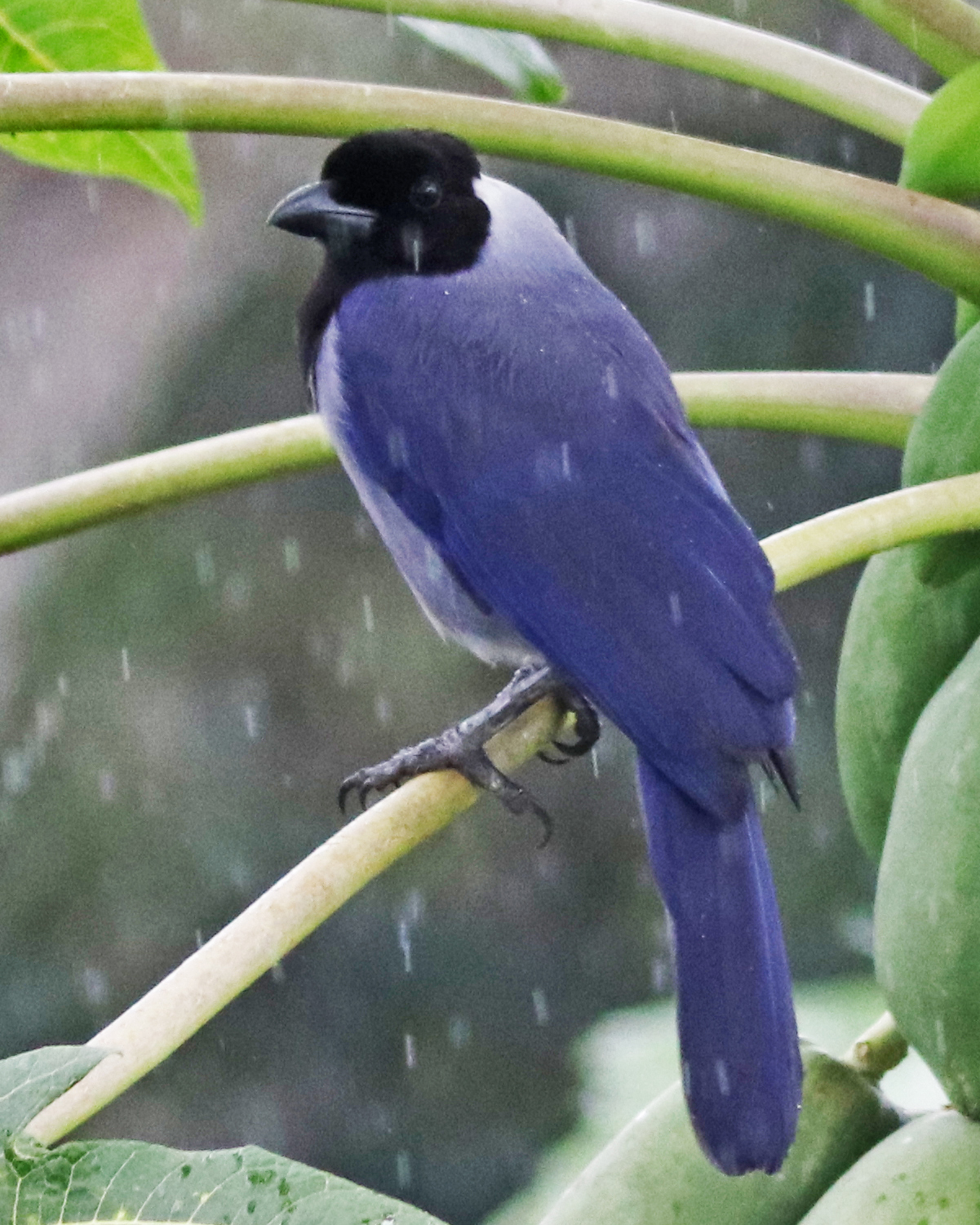
Perched in the rain in eastern Ecuador

== Description ==
The violaceus jay is 33 to 37 cm (13 to 15 in) long and weighs about 260 g (9.2 oz). The sexes have similar plumage. Adult males of the nominate subspecies have a blackish forecrown and a blackish or dark sepia crown and sides of the head and neck. Their nape is pale bluish white that becomes pale blue at the base of the nape. Their upper back is pale violaceous blue and the rest of their upperparts a darker violaceous blue. Their primaries are blackish with violaceous blue on their outer edges. Their tail is indigo-blue. Their throat and upper breast are the same blackish or dark sepia as the sides of the head, and the rest of their underparts are violaceous blue. The undersides of their wings and tail have a blackish tinge. Adult females have a grayish tinge on their underparts and are otherwise like males. Subspecies C. v. pallidus has the same pattern as the nominate but is significantly paler overall. Juveniles are overall slightly grayer than adults. Both subspecies have a dark brown iris, a black bill, and black legs and feet.

== Distribution and habitat ==
The violaceous jay is primarily a bird of the western Amazon Basin. Subspecies C. v. pallidus is the more northerly of the two and has a much smaller range than the nominate. It is found in northern and northeastern Anzoátegui state in northern Venezuela. The nominate subspecies is found in Venezuela from southern Anzoátegui south through Amazonas. It also is found on the eastern side of the Andes from Portuguesa south to Táchira. Its range continues south through western Brazil and the eastern half of Colombia, eastern Ecuador, and eastern Peru into northern Bolivia. The eastern edge of its Brazilian range follows a line roughly from Roraima south to western Mato Grosso. Though some sources include Guyana in the species' range, the South American Classification Committee has no documented records and callis it "unconfirmed" in that country.

The violaceous jay inhabits a variety of forested landscapes both primary and secondary. It tends to be more numerous along watercourses. In Brazil, Ecuador, and Peru it favors várzea forest. In Venezuela it ranges in elevation up to 400 m (1,300 ft) and in Brazil to 1,000 m (3,300 ft). In Colombia it is found below 1,200 m (3,900 ft), in Ecuador mostly below 500 m (1,600 ft), and in Peru mostly below 900 m (3,000 ft) but locally as high as 1,400 m (4,600 ft).

== Behavior ==
=== Movement ===
The violaceous jay is a year-round resident.

=== Feeding ===
The violaceous jay is omnivorous. It primarily feeds on fruit, arthropods, and eggs, and has been observed feeding on lizards. It forages in flocks of up to about 12 individuals, keeping mostly in the forest's canopy.

=== Breeding ===
The one described violaceous jay nest was found with five eggs in April in Venezuela. It was made from large twigs with a lining of fine plant fibers and placed about 9 m (30 ft) above the ground in the crown of a tree. The eggs were bluish white with many brown speckles. Its full breeding season and incubation period, time to fledging, and details of parental care are not known.

=== Vocalization ===
The violaceous jay's typical call is "a downwardly inflected Jeeeer! given several times". It also makes "a clop-clop-clop-clop, various quiet chortling gurgles, a descending ripple, and a guttural clicking".

== Status ==
The IUCN has assessed the violaceous jay as being of Least Concern. It has a very large range; its population size is not known and is believed to be decreasing. No immediate threats have been identified. It is considered "uncommon to locally fairly common" in Venezuela, common in Colombia and Ecuador, "uncommon but widespread" in Peru, and "frequent to uncommon" in Brazil.
