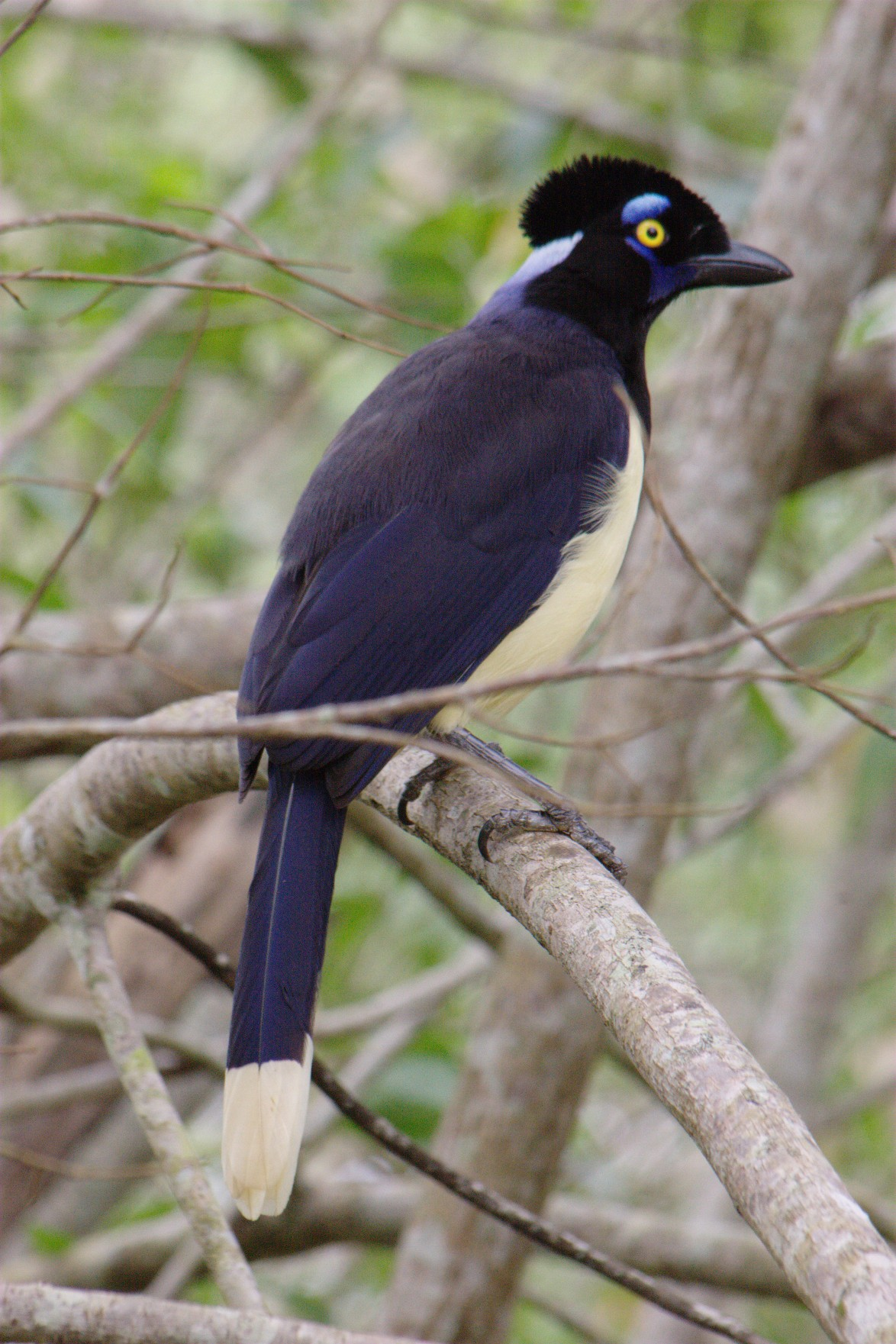
- Plush-crested jay, Cyanocorax chrysops

Scientific classification
- Kingdom: Animalia
- Phylum: Chordata
- Class: Aves
- Order: Passeriformes
- Family: Corvidae
- Subfamily: Cyanocoracinae
- Genus: Cyanocorax; F. Boie, 1826

Type species
- Corvus pileatus Temminck, 1821

Species
- 20, see text

Synonyms
- Calocitta G. R. Gray, 1841; Cissilopha Bonaparte, 1850; Psilorhinus Rüppell, 1838; Uroleuca Bonaparte, 1859; Xanthoura Bonaparte, 1850

= Cyanocorax =

Genus of birds

Cyanocorax is a genus of New World jays, passerine birds in the family Corvidae. It contains several closely related species that primarily are found in wooded habitats, chiefly in lowland tropical rainforest but in some cases also in seasonally dry forest, grassland and montane forest. They occur from Mexico through Central into southern South America, with the green jay and brown jay just entering the United States in southernmost Texas, and the azure and plush-crested jays occurring southwards to the lower Paraná River basin. This genus is considered especially close to Cyanolyca, an upland radiation occurring throughout the American Cordillera from Mexico to Peru and Bolivia, who look very similar to the blue-and-black species of Cyanocorax except for being a bit smaller. The North American blue jay genera Aphelocoma, Cyanocitta and Gymnorhinus seem to be slightly less closely related.

Cyanocorax jays are generally black-and-blue, often with considerable amounts of white plumage, but brown or yellow to green in a few species. Some species have elongated neck plumes, some others have crests or bristle tufts on the forehead; a few have patches of bare skin on the face. The eyes are bright yellow in just over half the species, the bills black in adults (yellow to pinkish in juveniles), and the feet usually black, but brown or yellow in a few species.

The genus Cyanocorax was described by the German zoologist Friedrich Boie in 1826, with the plush-crested jay as the type species. The generic name is derived from the Ancient Greek words κυανος (kuanos), meaning "dark blue", and κοραξ (korax), meaning "raven".

== Systematics and evolution ==
With the merge of the formerly separate genera Calocitta (the two magpie-jays) and Psilorhinus (brown jay) into Cyanocorax, the genus now contains around 20 species:

The expanded genus Cyanocorax can be neatly divided into two clades, the first containing the former Calocitta and Psilorhinus, as well as the South American lineage which was historically treated as genus Uroleucus. The other clade unites the remaining South American species with the group formerly separated as Cissilopha, as well as the Inca jay group which are the only members of the genus to have conspicuous carotenoid (yellow/green) pigments in their plumage; some ornithologists treat the two taxa of the Inca jay group as conspecific, though there is deep genetic divergence between the two taxa as well as differences in their plumage, habitat, behaviour, and calls.

The origin of the genus seems to be the Isthmus of Panama region or the northern Andes. An initial split resulted on one hand in a triple radiation along the Caribbean (Psilorhinus) and Pacific (Calocitta) coasts of Central America, as well as into South America (Uroleuca). Concurrently, the ancestors of the White-tailed jay became separated west of the northern Andes, on the Pacific coast of northwestern South America, while the Xanthoura radiation expanded along the foothills of the main Andes chain and adjacent mountain ranges, as well as into the Central American lowlands. From the same stock as the preceding two, a second multi-pronged radiation expanded into Central America (the former Cissilopha species) as well as into South America (in two branches, a northern and a southeastwards one). The Tufted jay, the northwesternmost member of this genus, seems to be a distinct fourth and ancient branch of this radiation, perhaps a remnant of an early expansion that largely went extinct as the Cissilopha lineage displaced it.

=== Species ===
Image	Scientific name	Common name	Distribution
C. formosus group (Calocitta): Pacific Central America
	Cyanocorax colliei	Black-throated magpie-jay	west Mexico
	Cyanocorax formosus	White-throated magpie-jay	southwest Mexico to Costa Rica
C. morio lineage (Psilorhinus): Caribbean Central America
	Cyanocorax morio	Brown jay	widespread in eastern Mexico and Central America, also in south Texas
C. cyanomelas group (Uroleuca): South America
	Cyanocorax coeruleus (tentatively placed in this group)	Azure jay	southeastern Brazil (São Paulo to Rio Grande do Sul), far eastern Paraguay and far north-eastern Argentina
	Cyanocorax violaceus (paraphyletic?)	Violaceous jay	Bolivia, Brazil, Colombia, Ecuador, Guyana, Peru, and Venezuela
	Cyanocorax cyanomelas	Purplish jay	northern Argentina, Bolivia, southern Brazil, Paraguay and southeastern Peru
	Cyanocorax cristatellus	Curl-crested jay	northeastern Brazil
C. yncas group (Xanthoura): lowland Central and upland South America
	Cyanocorax luxuosus	Green jay	southern Texas to Honduras
	Cyanocorax yncas	Inca jay	Andes Mts from Colombia and Venezuela through Ecuador and Peru to Bolivia
C. mystacalis lineage: northwest (Pacific) South America
	Cyanocorax mystacalis	White-tailed jay	Ecuador and Peru
C. beecheii group (Cissilopha): Central America
	Cyanocorax melanocyaneus	Bushy-crested jay	Guatemala, El Salvador, Honduras and Nicaragua
	Cyanocorax yucatanicus	Yucatan jay	Yucatán Peninsula
	Cyanocorax beecheii	Purplish-backed jay	northwestern Mexico
	Cyanocorax sanblasianus	San Blas jay	Mexico
C. dickeyi lineage: Pacific Mexico
	Cyanocorax dickeyi	Tufted jay	Sierra Madre Occidental of Sinaloa and Durango in Mexico
C. affinis group: northern (Caribbean) South America
	Cyanocorax affinis	Black-chested jay	Colombia, northwestern Venezuela, Panama and far eastern Costa Rica
	Cyanocorax heilprini (includes Campina jay C. [heilprini] hafferi, treated as a separate species by some authors)	Azure-naped jay	Brazil, Colombia, and Venezuela
C. cayanus group: eastern (Atlantic) South America
	Cyanocorax cayanus	Cayenne jay	Brazil, French Guiana, Guyana, Suriname, and Venezuela
	Cyanocorax chrysops	Plush-crested jay	southwestern Brazil, Bolivia, Paraguay, Uruguay, and northeastern Argentina
	Cyanocorax cyanopogon	White-naped jay	Brazil

=== Evolution ===
The fossil corvid Protocitta dixi, described from Middle Pleistocene (Illinoian, Penultimate Glacial Period, roughly 150.000 years ago) remains found in a former cave near Reddick, Florida, was described as similar to both Calocitta and Psilorhinus lineages. Although no cladistic analysis was conducted, at least qualitatively it was assessed as less closely related to the Holarctic magpies, who are a member of the "monochrome" radiation of crows and ravens, so it is very likely that Protocitta was indeed a prehistoric American blue jay. No Cyanocorax is attested from anywhere near Florida however, and since Protocitta was not compared to the North American radiation of blue jays, it is at least as likely to belong with the latter group.
