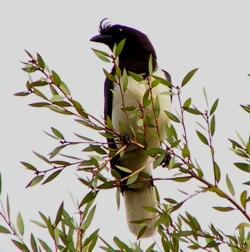
- Male

Conservation status
- Least Concern (IUCN 3.1)

Scientific classification
- Kingdom: Animalia
- Phylum: Chordata
- Class: Aves
- Order: Passeriformes
- Family: Corvidae
- Genus: Cyanocorax
- Species: C. cristatellus

Binomial name
- Cyanocorax cristatellus (Temminck, 1823)

= Curl-crested jay =

Species of bird

The curl-crested jay (Cyanocorax cristatellus) is a species of jay native to South America.

This New World jay is a beautiful and large (35 cm/14 in overall) bird with predominantly dark blue back, an almost black head and neck, and snow-white chest and underparts. They have a pronounced curled crest rising from just behind the beak; the crest is on average larger in males, but the sexes are generally quite similar.

The voice is a loud, gray, graa, gray-gray-gray, sometimes repeated 8-10 times. They sound similar to crow.

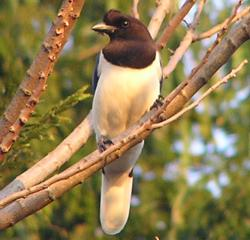
Female curl-crested jay

Curl-crested jays are native to the cerrados of central and southern and the caatinga of north-eastern Brazil. In the southeast Amazon Basin, curl-crested jay ranges into the upstream headwater regions adjacent to the northwestern cerrado. In the west, the extreme headwaters of the west-flowing Guaporé River on the Brazil-Bolivia are home. For the southeast Amazon, the north-flowing rivers that limit the range are the Tapajós on the west, the Xingu River, then the adjacent drainage to the east, the Araguaia-Tocantins River system. The range continues easterly and southerly through the cerrado. The range on the river systems is only the upstream half of the drainages. They can also be found in extreme northern Paraguay. Altogether, they are limited by the extent of habitat, but wherever this is suitable, they may not be rare. For example, they are the most commonly seen corvid in the Serra do Cipó National Park.

They live in groups of from 6 to 12 individuals, moving from food source to food source during the day. They leave a lookout nearby to keep watch for predators. This bird is a generalist, eating almost anything, including eggs and nestlings of other birds, insects, arthropods, and small vertebrates like geckos. It also likes palm nuts and is particularly fond of the seeds of the native Inga laurina and the fruits of the introduced umbrella tree (Heptapleurum actinophyllum). Curl-crested jays have even been observed spending the early morning in a pequi tree (Caryocar brasiliense) where they fed on nectar, and perhaps also on invertebrates which had visited the mainly night-blooming flowers of this plant.

This jay is not considered a threatened species by the IUCN, and in fact they are at present expanding their range. However, range expansions may only be temporary and populations may eventually disappear from formerly settled locations again.
