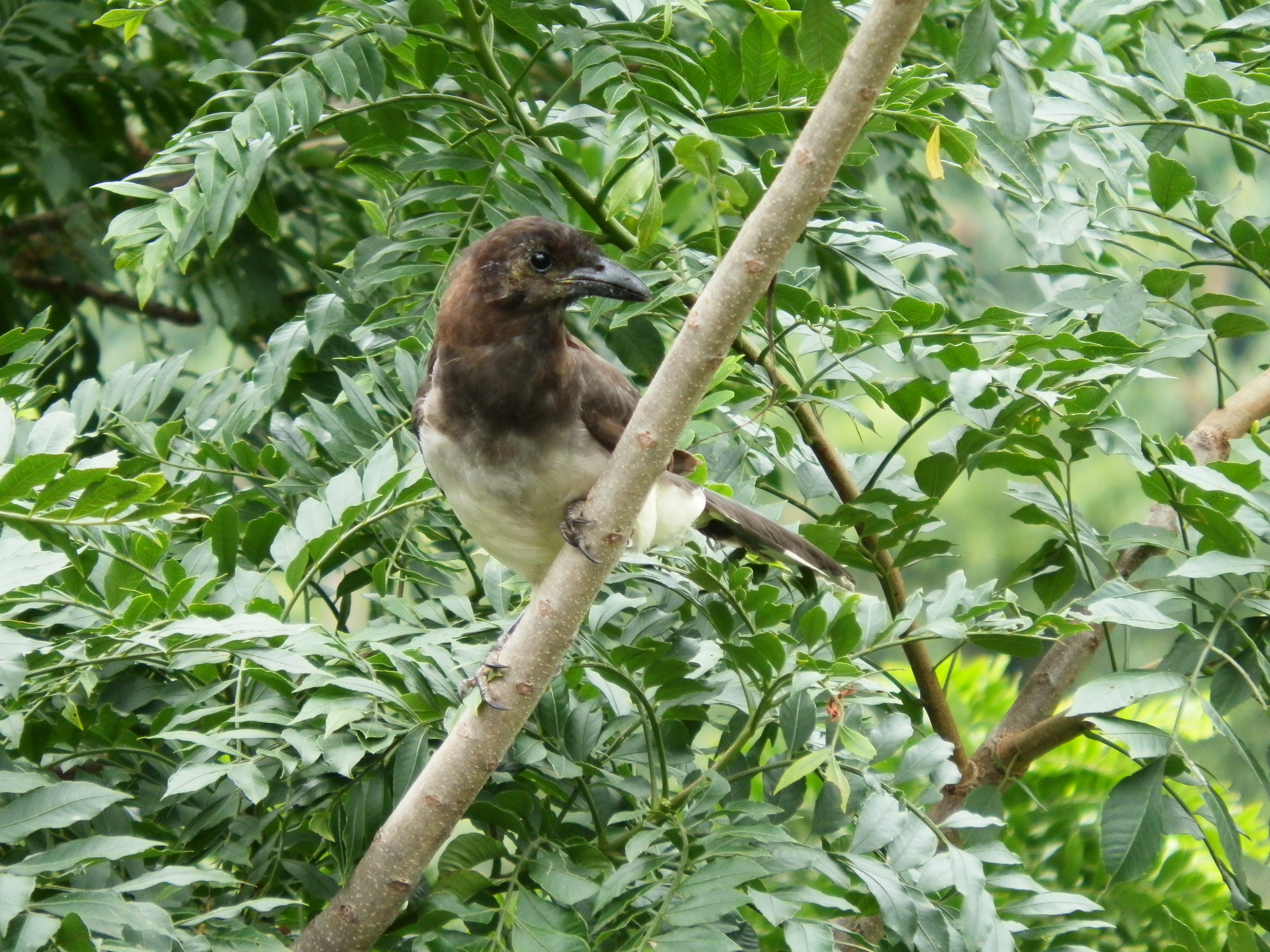
- Adult bird. Aserrí, Costa Rica

Conservation status
- Least Concern (IUCN 3.1)

Scientific classification
- Kingdom: Animalia
- Phylum: Chordata
- Class: Aves
- Order: Passeriformes
- Family: Corvidae
- Genus: Cyanocorax
- Species: C. morio

Binomial name
- Cyanocorax morio (Wagler, 1829)
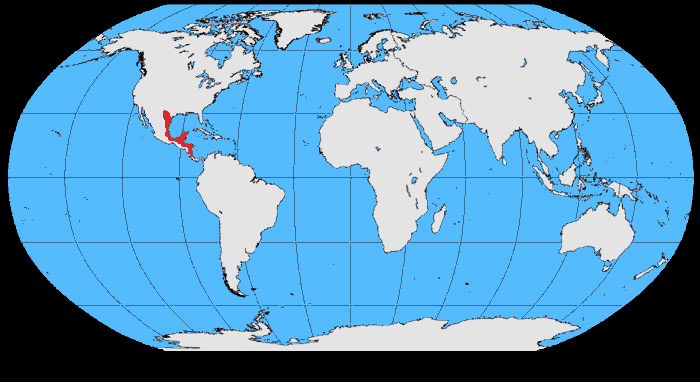
- Range (click to magnify)

Synonyms
- Psilorhinus mexicanus Psilorhinus morio

= Brown jay =

Species of bird

The brown jay (Cyanocorax morio) is a large jay native to Central America and southern Texas.

== Taxonomy ==
The brown jay was formerly placed in its own genus Psilorhinus. When molecular phylogenetic studies found that the genus Cyanocorax was paraphyletic relative to Psilorhinus, Psilorhinus was subsumed into Cyanocorax to resolve the paraphyly.

Three subspecies are recognised:

- C. m. palliatus (Van Rossem, 1934) – extreme south Texas (south USA) and northeast, east Mexico
- C. m. morio (Wagler, 1829) – southeast Mexico to west Panama
- C. m. vociferus (Cabot, S, 1843) – north Yucatán Peninsula (southeast Mexico)

== Description ==
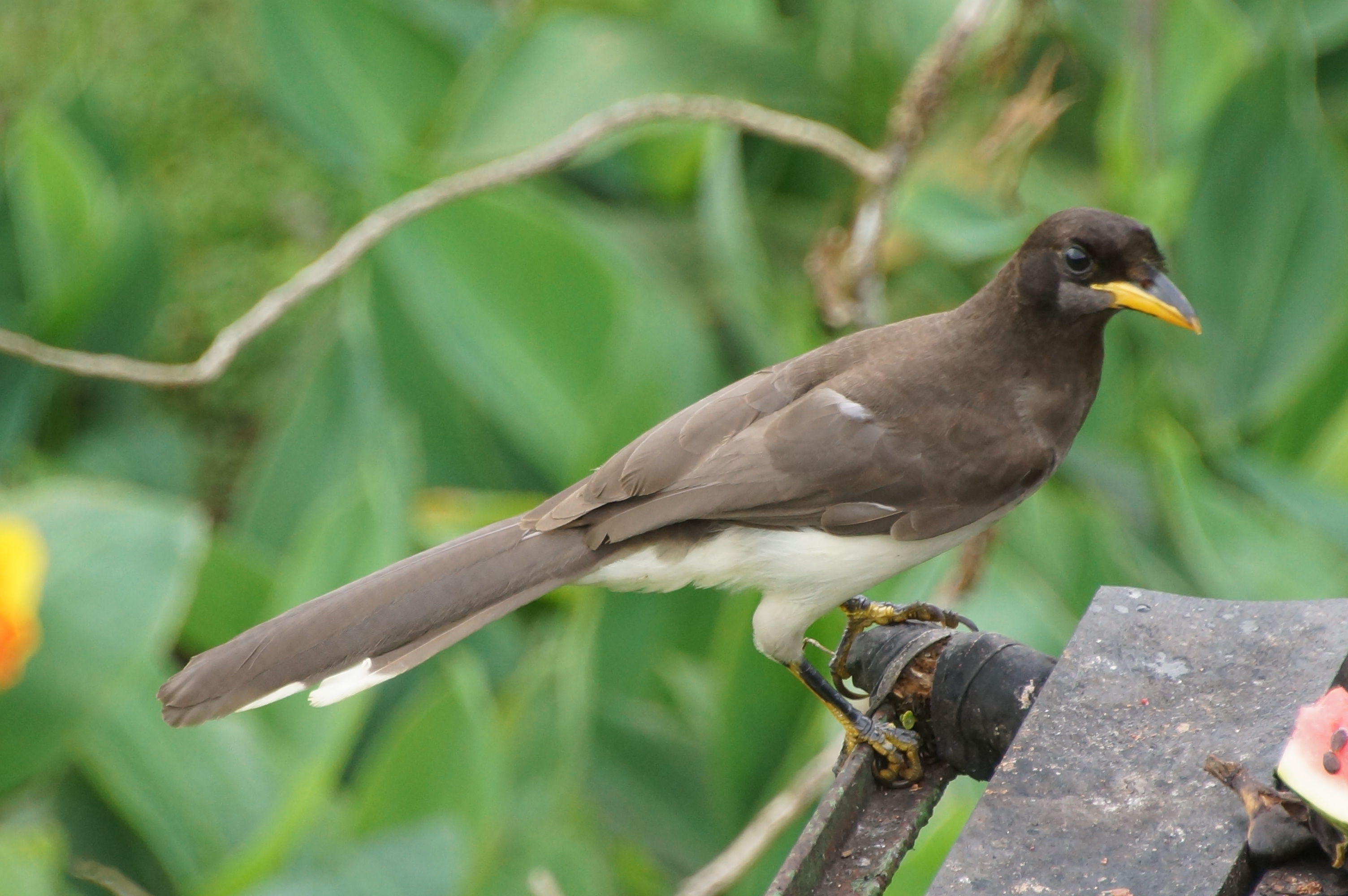
Subadult in Costa Rica

Brown jays vary in plumage geographically: there are two main groups. Northern birds are almost completely dark brown, with lighter brown on the underparts. Southern birds are white-bellied and have bright white tips to the outer tail feathers. The intergrade zone is in Veracruz, Mexico. Adults in both populations have black bills, legs, and feet. Immatures have yellow bare parts, including yellow eye-rings.

The voice is a loud but low-pitched pee-ah call and is often modified to suit its situation or mood.

== Distribution and habitat ==
The northernmost extent of the brown jay is in the lower Rio Grande Valley of Texas close to the Mexican border; from Mexico it occurs south into Central America. in Mexico it occurs widely in the east and southeast. In Central America, it is widespread on the Gulf slope from Belize south to western Panama; it is scarcer on the Pacific slope, and in El Salvador is confined to the far northeast in Morazán Department close to the Honduras border.

== Behaviour and ecology ==
Food is sought largely in trees but brown jays also take some food from the ground. They are rather indiscriminate feeders. Insects and a wide range of other invertebrates are taken, also lizards, nectar, and fruit (e.g. that of Trophis racemosa in the Moraceae). Though they will take eggs and nestlings, they appear not to if there is plenty of other food available.

The nest is built in a tree or large shrub with both sexes helping in construction. There are normally three eggs laid but up to six is not unusual. Incubation is between 18 and 20 days. Only the female broods but the male feeds her while doing so.

Sometimes the offspring from a previous season will help in raising the chicks. If a helper bird returns with food, it will give it to one of the resident parents to feed the chicks.
