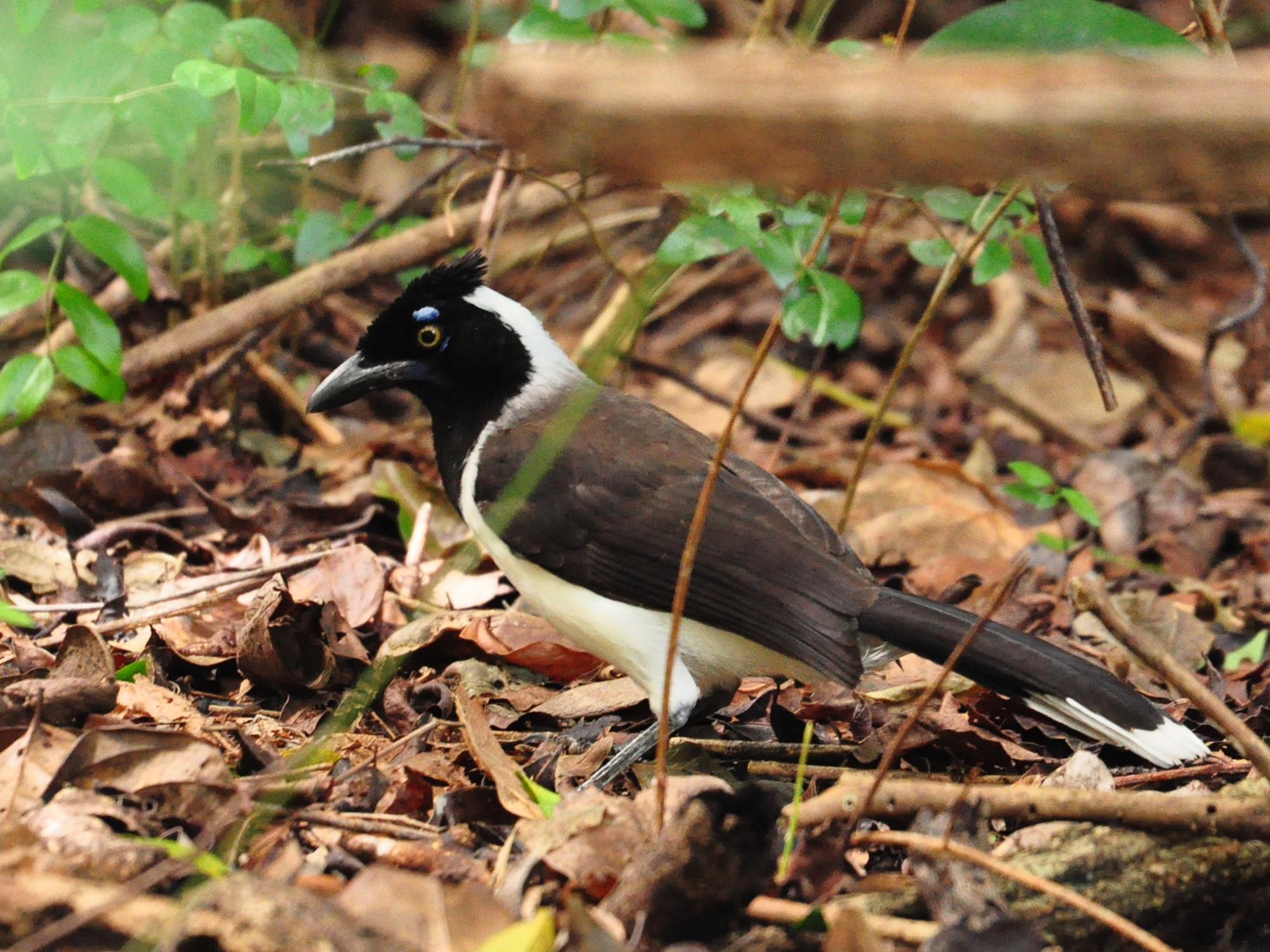
- In Natal, Rio Grande do Norte, Brazil

Conservation status
- Least Concern (IUCN 3.1)

Scientific classification
- Kingdom: Animalia
- Phylum: Chordata
- Class: Aves
- Order: Passeriformes
- Family: Corvidae
- Genus: Cyanocorax
- Species: C. cyanopogon

Binomial name
- Cyanocorax cyanopogon (Wied, 1821)

= White-naped jay =

Species of bird

The white-naped jay (Cyanocorax cyanopogon) is a species of bird in the family Corvidae. It is endemic to Brazil - where it is known as the Gralha Cancã or the Cancão. Its natural habitats are subtropical or tropical dry forest and subtropical or tropical moist lowland forest.

They are capable of interbreeding with plush-crested jays, and hybrids between the species have been observed. The species are visually similar and often are mistaken for each other.

They sometimes serve as a food source for humans. They are also sometimes kept as pets.
