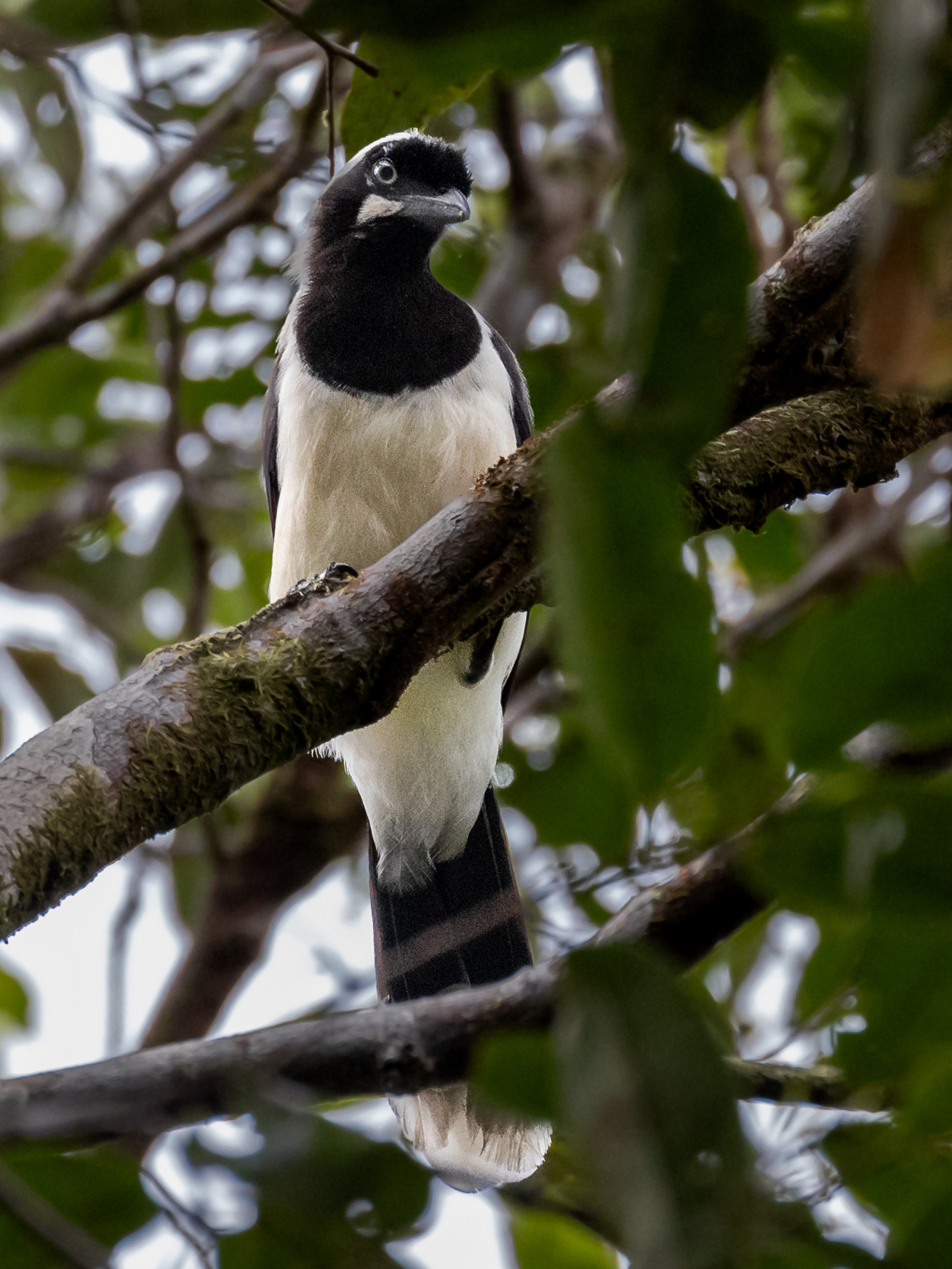
- In Porto Grande, Amapá

Conservation status
- Least Concern (IUCN 3.1)

Scientific classification
- Kingdom: Animalia
- Phylum: Chordata
- Class: Aves
- Order: Passeriformes
- Family: Corvidae
- Genus: Cyanocorax
- Species: C. cayanus

Binomial name
- Cyanocorax cayanus (Linnaeus, 1766)

Synonyms
- Corvus cayanus Linnaeus, 1766

= Cayenne jay =

Species of bird

The Cayenne jay (Cyanocorax cayanus) is a species of bird in the family Corvidae. It is found in Brazil, French Guiana, Guyana, Suriname, and Venezuela. Its natural habitats are subtropical or tropical moist lowland forest, subtropical or tropical dry shrubland, and heavily degraded former forest.

In 1760 the French zoologist Mathurin Jacques Brisson included a description of the Cayenne jay in his Ornithologie based on a specimen collected in Cayenne, French Guiana. He used the French name Le geay de Cayenne and the Latin Garrulus Cayanensis. Although Brisson coined Latin names, these do not conform to the binomial system and are not recognised by the International Commission on Zoological Nomenclature. When in 1766 the Swedish naturalist Carl Linnaeus updated his Systema Naturae for the twelfth edition, he added 240 species that had been previously described by Brisson. One of these was the Cayenne jay. Linnaeus included a brief description, coined the binomial name Corvus cayanus and cited Brisson's work. This species is now placed in the genus Cyanocorax that was introduced by the German zoologist Friedrich Boie in 1826. No subspecies are recognised.

== Description ==
The cayenne jay is a medium sized jay, roughly 33 cm (13 in) long. It has a generally purplish back with white undersides. Its back and tail are a purplish-brown, with a white tail-tip. Its wings fade from the purplish-brown of the back to a darker purplish-blue. Its neck is a sooty grey, fading to white on its undersides. Its face and throat are generally black, with white spots above and below the eye, and along the malar. The edges of these white spots fade to a mauve colour. It has a short black crest on the top of its head. Its beak has a black beak and tarsus, with light blue or white irises. Juveniles are overall duller in colour. The tip of the tail is less white and more violet, and the white spots above and below the eyes are smaller or missing altogether.

Males and females are generally the same size, with females weighing 174.6 g (6.16 oz) and males 174.8 g (6.17 oz). The wing length of females averages 159.8 mm (6.29 in) and males average 159.5 mm (6.28 in). For both sexes, the average tail length is 140 mm (5.5 in), the average bill length is 36 mm (1.4 in), and the average tarsus length is 46 mm (1.8 in).
