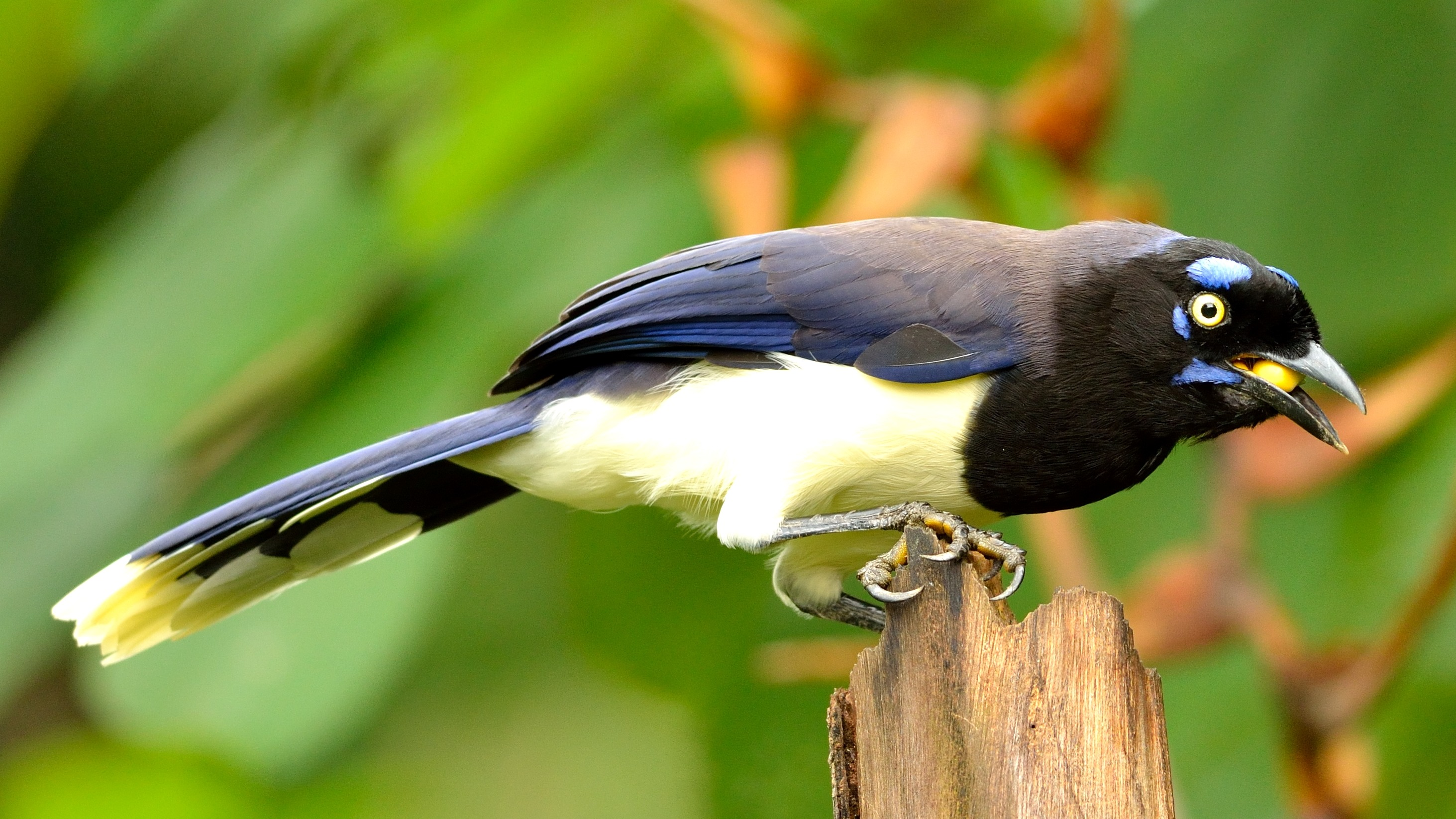

Conservation status
- Least Concern (IUCN 3.1)

Scientific classification
- Kingdom: Animalia
- Phylum: Chordata
- Class: Aves
- Order: Passeriformes
- Family: Corvidae
- Genus: Cyanocorax
- Species: C. affinis

Binomial name
- Cyanocorax affinis Pelzeln, 1856

= Black-chested jay =

Species of bird

The black-chested jay (Cyanocorax affinis) is a species of bird in the family Corvidae.

== Description ==
Measuring 34 cm (13 in) long, this jay is easily recognized from its distinctive facial pattern and yellow eye. The head, face, and chest are mostly black with violet-blue spots above and below the eye, as well as a violet-blue malar stripe. The underparts are white as is the tip of the tail, while the upperparts and wings are mainly dark violet-blue. It does not exhibit sexual dimorphism.

== Distribution and Habitat ==
It is found in Colombia, northwestern Venezuela, Panama and far eastern Costa Rica. Its natural habitats are subtropical or tropical dry forests, subtropical or tropical moist lowland forests, and heavily degraded former forest.

Its population is stable.
