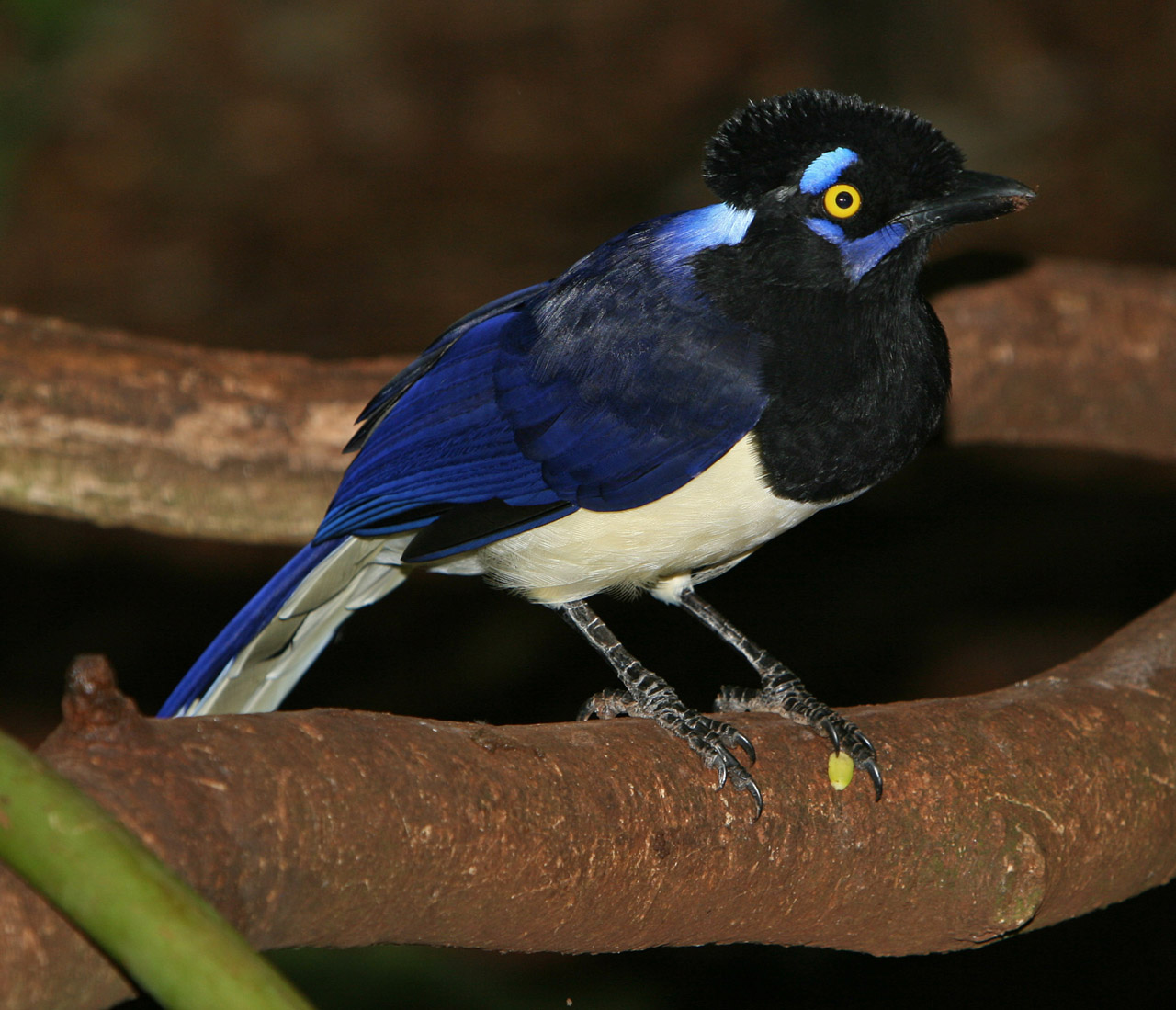
- In Foz do Iguaçu, Brazil

Conservation status
- Least Concern (IUCN 3.1)

Scientific classification
- Kingdom: Animalia
- Phylum: Chordata
- Class: Aves
- Order: Passeriformes
- Family: Corvidae
- Genus: Cyanocorax
- Species: C. chrysops

Binomial name
- Cyanocorax chrysops (Vieillot, 1818)

= Plush-crested jay =

Species of bird

The plush-crested jay (Cyanocorax chrysops) is a jay of the family Corvidae (which includes the crows and their many allies). It is found in central-southern South America: in southwestern Brazil, Bolivia, Paraguay, Uruguay, and northeastern Argentina, including southern regions of the Amazon Basin river systems bordering the Pantanal.

== Description ==
The plush-crested jay is a medium-sized bird with an overall dark blue colored plumage. It has a cream-yellow underbelly, undertail coverts, underwings, and tail tip, while the upper breast, neck, and head are mostly black. It has a lighter blue on its cheeks and nape, which fades into the darker blue of its body, as well as a spot above its eyes, which are yellow. Its bill is dark blue to black. It has a rounded crest on its head, which it is named for.

== Distribution ==
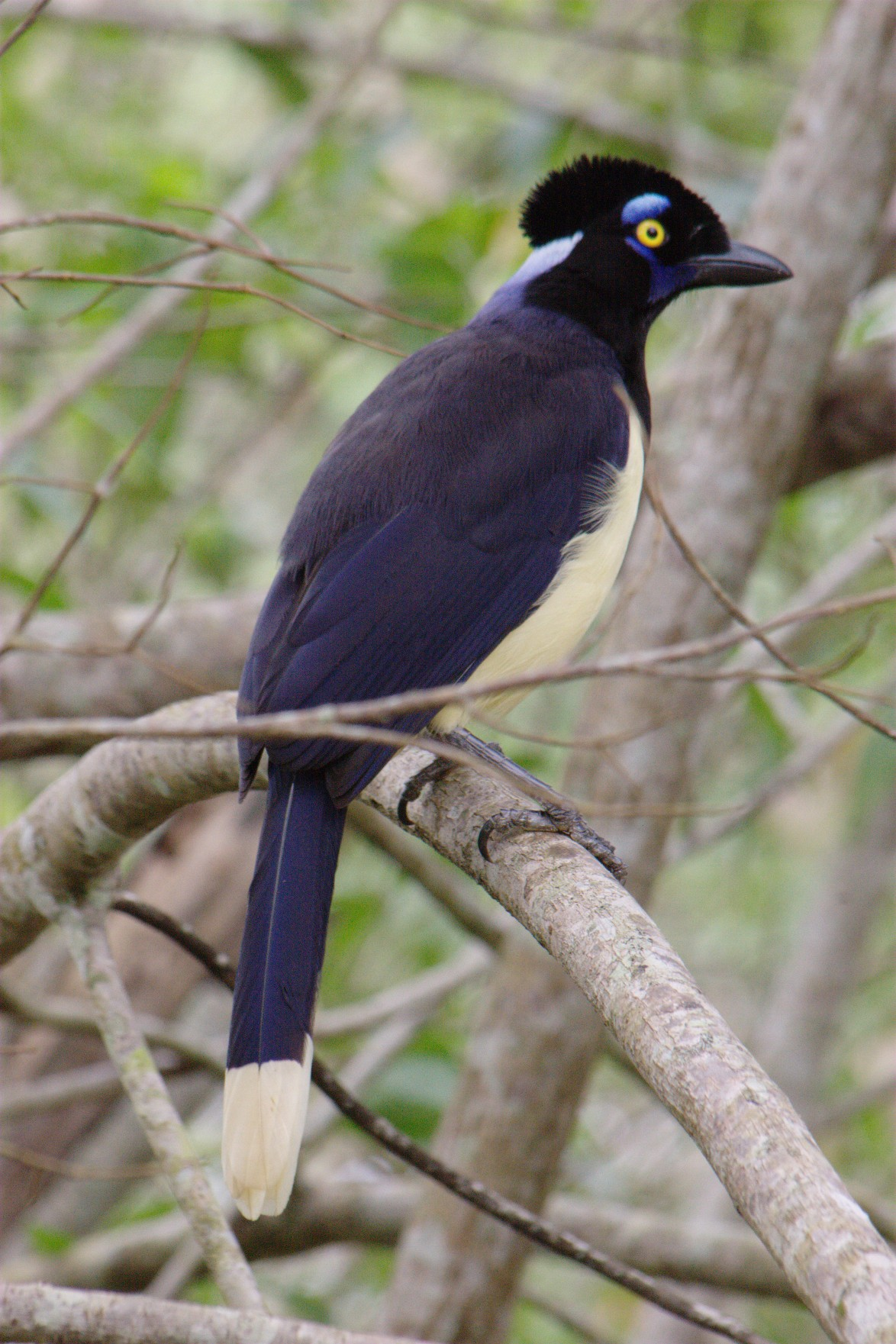
Plush-crested jay

The range of the plush-crested jay extends from the Southern Region, Brazil with Uruguay and approaches the South Atlantic coast, but avoids the coast, approximating a 400 to 150 km coastal strip; the coastal-inland range extends 3500 km from São Paulo south to Rio Grande do Sul bordering Uruguay. The inland range continues in northwestern Uruguay and extends northwest through northern Argentina, Paraguay–Bolivia, and through the Pantanal at the southern Cerrado; the range extends in two arms, to the northwest to northern Bolivia, and northeastwards to headwaters of the Amazon Basin Tapajós River.

In the Amazon Basin, central Bolivia is the northwest range limit, the headwater tributaries to the north-northeast flowing Madeira River; the next range skips the Guaporé River, (a northwest-flowing tributary to the Madeira), eastwards on the Brazil–Bolivia border, and is next found at the headwaters of the Tapajós River, and joins on the east the extreme headwaters of the Xingu River.

A disjunct range occurs downstream on the Tapajós and east towards the Xingu River, a block 850 by 750 kilometres (530 mi × 470 mi). Two other localized populations occur in the Amazon Basin, one on the Amazon River, the other on the downstream Madeira River.

== Diet ==
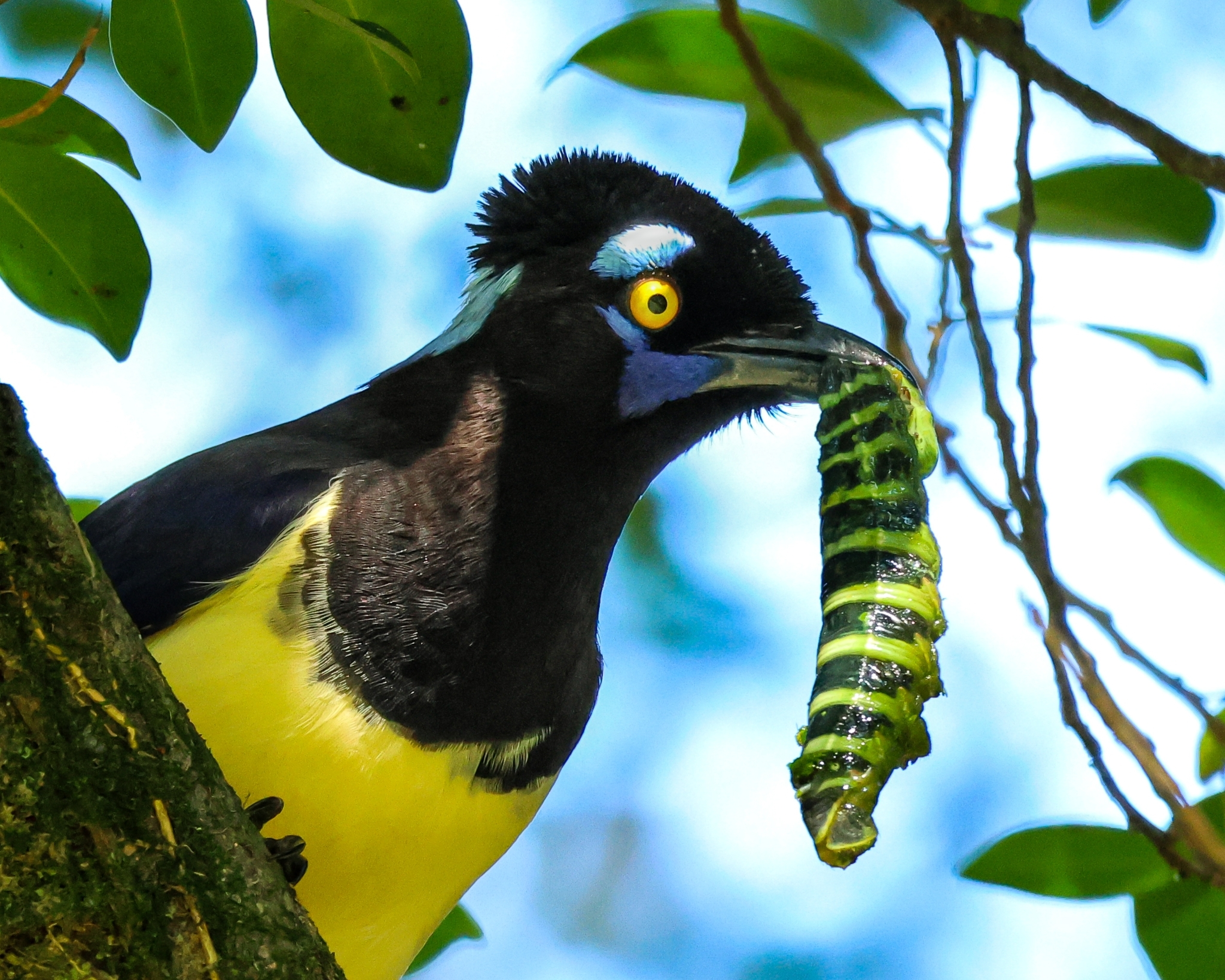
Eating a Pachylia syces caterpillar

Plush-crested jays are omnivorous, eating primarily seeds, nuts, insects, small invertebrates, and sometimes fruits or maize. Depending on food availability, they may also take other species' eggs and small animals such as frogs or snakes.

== Behavior ==
The plush-crested jay is a non-migratory, social bird, forming flocks of 5 to 11 individuals in Spring and summer, and 8 to 15 during fall and winter. The rearing of chicks is cooperative, as several members of the flock perform the role of "helpers", bringing food to the brood, disposing of fecal matter and defending the nest from predators.

While foraging for food, they will stay on the ground or occasionally forage in trees for food. They have also been observed following ants back to their nests, either to eat them or other insects nearby.
