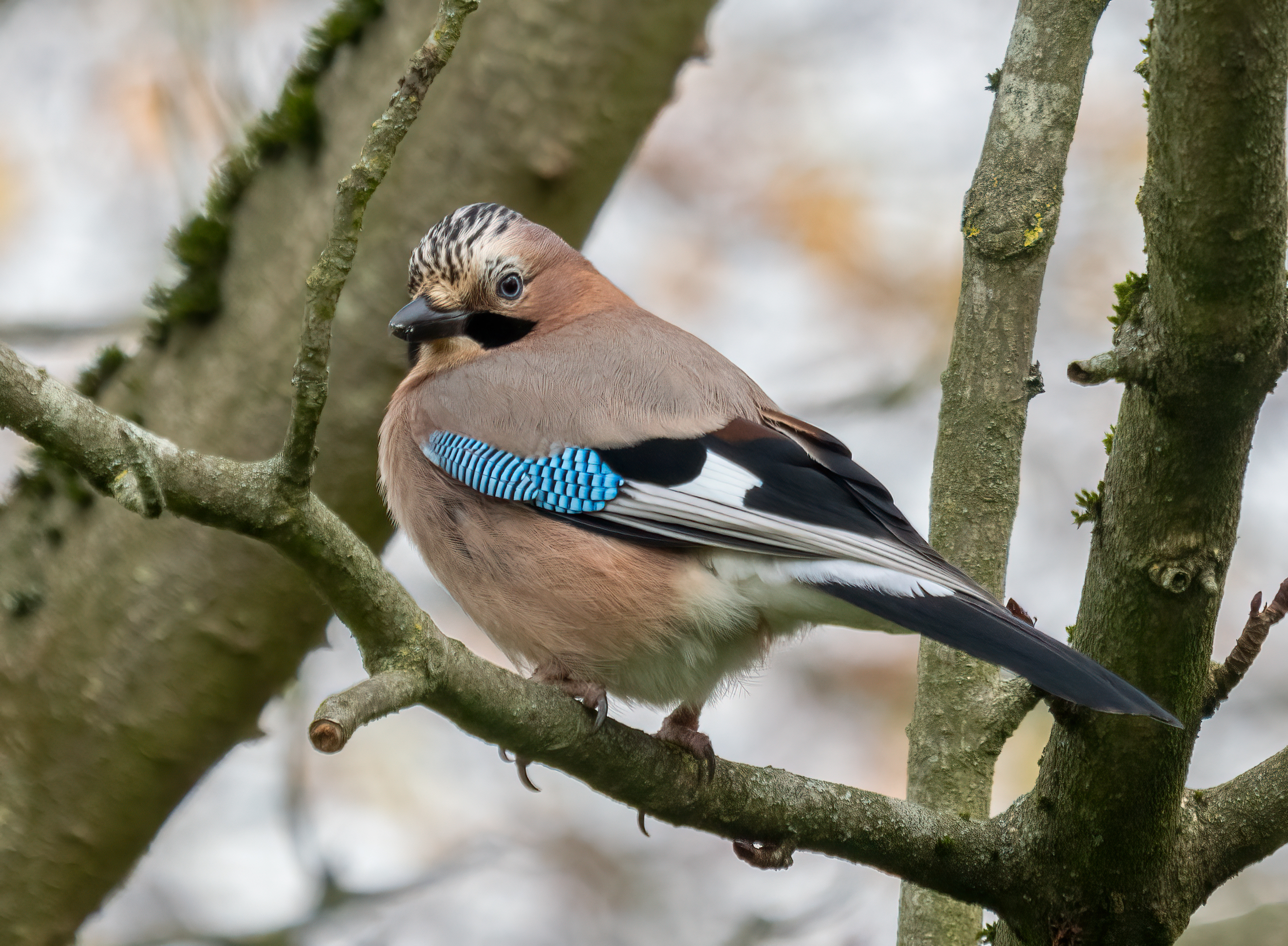
- Eurasian jay (Garrulus glandarius)
- Eurasian jay calling 'jay'

Scientific classification
- Kingdom: Animalia
- Phylum: Chordata
- Class: Aves
- Order: Passeriformes
- Superfamily: Corvoidea
- Family: Corvidae

Genera
- Garrulus; Podoces; Perisoreus; Aphelocoma; Gymnorhinus; Cyanocitta; Cyanocorax; Cyanolyca

Cladistically included but traditionally excluded taxa
- Cissa; Coloeus; Corvus; Crypsirina; Cyanopica; Dendrocitta; Nucifraga; Pica; Platysmurus; Ptilostomus; Pyrrhocorax; Temnurus; Urocissa; Zavattariornis

= Jay =

Bird

Jays are a paraphyletic grouping of passerine birds within the family Corvidae. Although the term "jay" is a folk taxonomy, most or all of the birds referred to as jays share a few similarities; they are small to medium-sized, usually have brightly coloured feathers and short tails, and are quite noisy. These superficial characteristics set them apart from most other corvids such as crows, ravens, jackdaws, rooks and magpies, which are mostly larger, or longer-tailed, and have darker plumage. Many so-called "jays" are genetically closer to these other corvids than to other jays, however. The name 'jay' is probably onomatopoeic, based on the raspy call of the species originally so named, Garrulus glandarius.

== Systematics and species ==
Jays are not a monophyletic group. Anatomical and molecular evidence indicates they can be divided into a New World and an Old World lineage (the latter including the ground jays and the piapiac), while the grey jays of the genus Perisoreus form a group of their own. The black magpies, formerly believed to be related to jays, are classified as treepies.

=== Old World ("brown") jays ===
Image	Genus	Living species
	Garrulus Brisson, 1760 - 'typical' jays	Eurasian jay, Garrulus glandarius; Lanceolated jay, Garrulus lanceolatus; Lidth's jay, Garrulus lidthi
	Podoces Fischer von Waldheim, 1821 - Ground jays	Mongolian ground jay, Podoces hendersoni; Xinjiang ground jay, Podoces biddulphi; Pleske's ground jay, Podoces pleskei; Turkestan ground jay, Podoces panderi

=== Grey jays ===
Image	Genus	Living species
	Perisoreus Bonaparte, 1831 - Grey jays	Siberian jay, Perisoreus infaustus; Sichuan jay, Perisoreus internigrans; Canada jay (formerly grey or gray jay), Perisoreus canadensis

=== New World jays ===
Image	Genus	Living species
	Aphelocoma Cabanis, 1851 - Scrub-jays	Florida scrub jay, Aphelocoma coerulescens; Island scrub jay, Aphelocoma insularis; California scrub jay, Aphelocoma californica; Woodhouse's scrub jay, Aphelocoma woodhouseii; Transvolcanic jay, Aphelocoma ultramarina; Mexican jay, Aphelocoma wollweberi; Unicolored jay, Aphelocoma unicolor
	Gymnorhinus Wied-Neuwied, 1841	Pinyon jay, Gymnorhinus cyanocephalus
	Cyanocitta Strickland, 1845	Steller's jay, Cyanocitta stelleri; Blue jay, Cyanocitta cristata
	Cyanocorax F. Boie, 1826	Tufted jay, Cyanocorax dickeyi; Black-chested jay, Cyanocorax affinis; Green jay, Cyanocorax luxuosus; Inca jay, Cyanocorax yncas; Brown jay, Cyanocorax morio; Bushy-crested jay, Cyanocorax melanocyaneus; San Blas jay, Cyanocorax sanblasianus; Yucatan jay, Cyanocorax yucatanicus; Purplish-backed jay, Cyanocorax beecheii; Purplish jay, Cyanocorax cyanomelas; Azure jay, Cyanocorax coeruleus; Violaceous jay, Cyanocorax violaceus; Curl-crested jay, Cyanocorax cristatellus; Azure-naped jay, Cyanocorax heilprini; Cayenne jay, Cyanocorax cayanus; Plush-crested jay, Cyanocorax chrysops; White-naped jay, Cyanocorax cyanopogon; White-tailed jay, Cyanocorax mystacalis; Black-throated magpie-jay, Cyanocorax colliei; White-throated magpie-jay, Cyanocorax formosus
	Cyanolyca Cabanis, 1851	Black-collared jay, Cyanolyca armillata; Turquoise jay, Cyanolyca turcosa; White-collared jay, Cyanolyca viridicyana; Azure-hooded jay, Cyanolyca cucullata; Beautiful jay, Cyanolyca pulchra; Black-throated jay, Cyanolyca pumilo; Dwarf jay, Cyanolyca nana; Silvery-throated jay, Cyanolyca argentigula; White-throated jay, Cyanolyca mirabilis

== In culture ==
=== Slang ===
The word jay has an archaic meaning in American slang meaning a person who chatters impertinently.

The term jaywalking was coined in the first decade of the 1900s to label persons crossing a busy street carelessly and becoming a traffic hazard. The term began to imply recklessness or impertinent behavior as the convention became established.

In January 2014, the Canadian author Robert Joseph Greene embarked on a lobbying campaign among ornithologists in Europe and North America to get Merriam-Websters Dictionary to have a "Jabber of Jays" as an official term under bird groups.
