= Collared jay =

The collared jays are two species of South American jays that used to be considered conspecific:

- Black-collared jay (Cyanolyca armillata) – Ecuador, Colombia and Venezuela.
- White-collared jay (Cyanolyca viridicyanus) – Bolivia and Peru.
