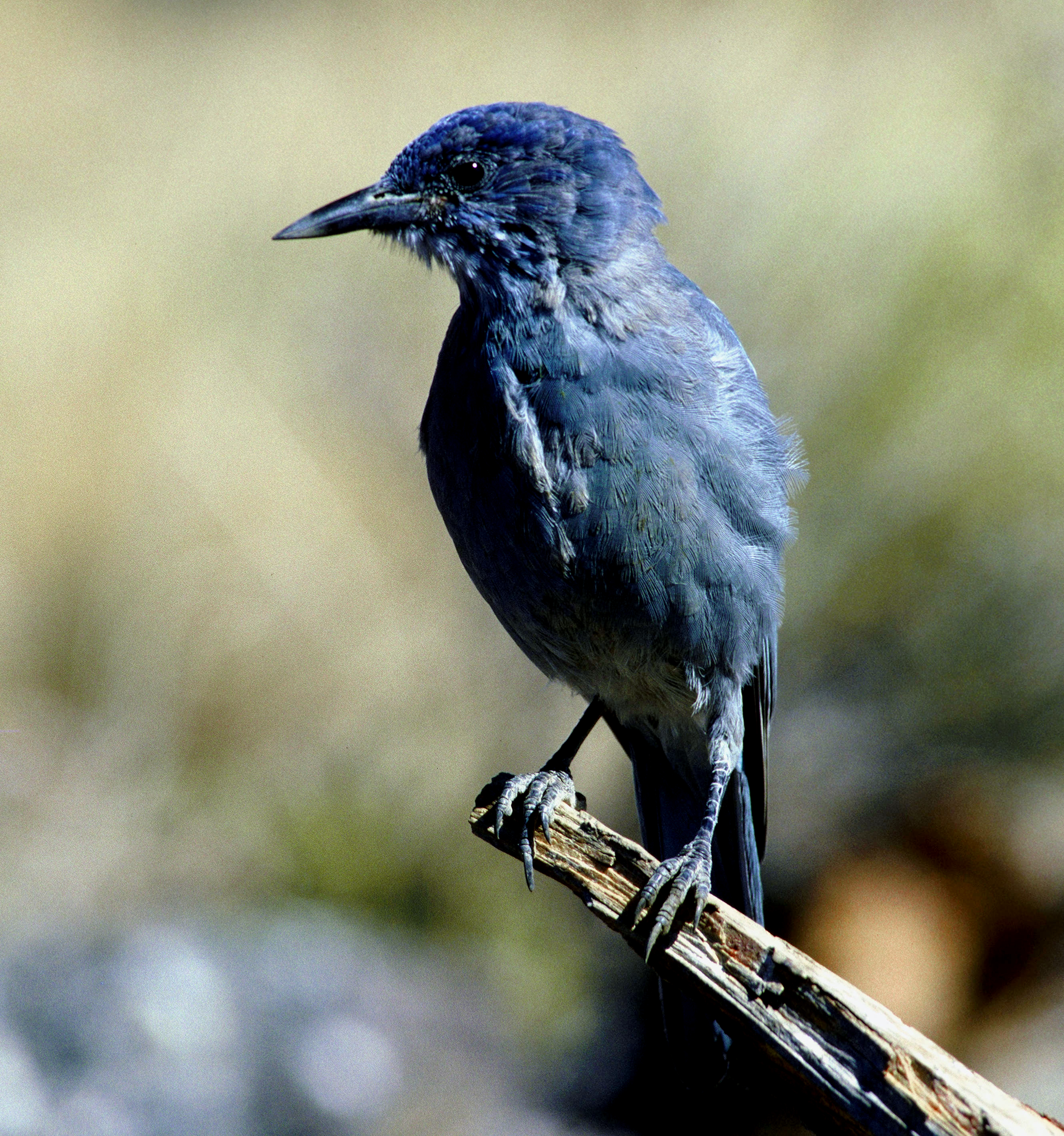

Conservation status
- Vulnerable (IUCN 3.1)

- Vulnerable (NatureServe)

Scientific classification
- Kingdom: Animalia
- Phylum: Chordata
- Class: Aves
- Order: Passeriformes
- Family: Corvidae
- Subfamily: Cyanocoracinae
- Genus: Gymnorhinus; Wied-Neuwied, 1841
- Species: G. cyanocephalus

Binomial name
- Gymnorhinus cyanocephalus Wied-Neuwied, 1841
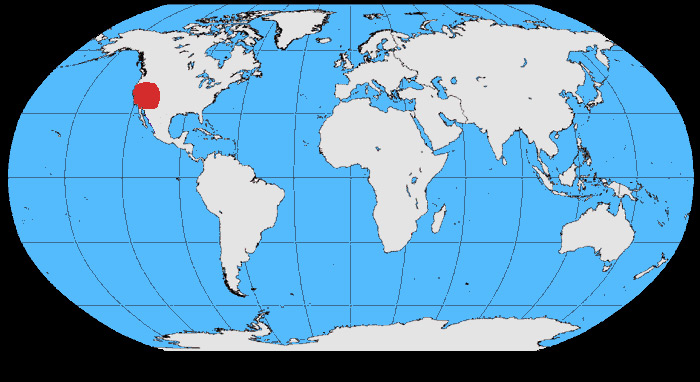
- Distribution (all-year resident)

= Pinyon jay =

Species of bird in North America

The pinyon jay (Gymnorhinus cyanocephalus) is a species of jay, and is the only member of the genus Gymnorhinus. Native to Western North America, the species ranges from central Oregon to northern Baja California, and eastward as far as western Oklahoma, though wanderers are often sighted beyond this range. It is typically found within foothills, especially where pinyon pines (Pinus edulis and Pinus monophylla) occur.

== Description ==
The pinyon jay is a bluish-grey coloured bird with deeper head colouring and whitish throat with black bill, legs and feet. Roughly intermediate between the blue jay and the Eurasian jay in size, its overall proportions are similar to Clark's nutcracker (Nucifraga columbiana) and this can be seen as convergent evolution, as both birds fill similar ecological niches. They were once known as "blue crows".

== Taxonomy ==
The pinyon jay was first collected, recorded, and first described as a species from a specimen shot along the Marias River in what is now northern Montana during the Prince Maximilian of Wied-Neuwied expedition to the interior of North America in 1833. A historical marker at LaHood Park on the Jefferson river in Montana, however, claims that the first pinyon jay known to science was seen and described by the Lewis and Clark Expedition at their campsite on this site on August 1, 1805.

It is the sole member of the genus Gymnorhinus. No subspecies are recognised.

Genetic analysis suggests that the pinyon jay is an offshoot from a lineage that gave rise to the scrub-jays and relatives (Aphelocoma) and Cyanocitta (the blue jay and Steller's jay).

The International Ornithologists' Union has designated "pinyon jay" the official common name for the species. It was historically known as the blue crow or Maximilian's jay.

== Distribution and habitat ==
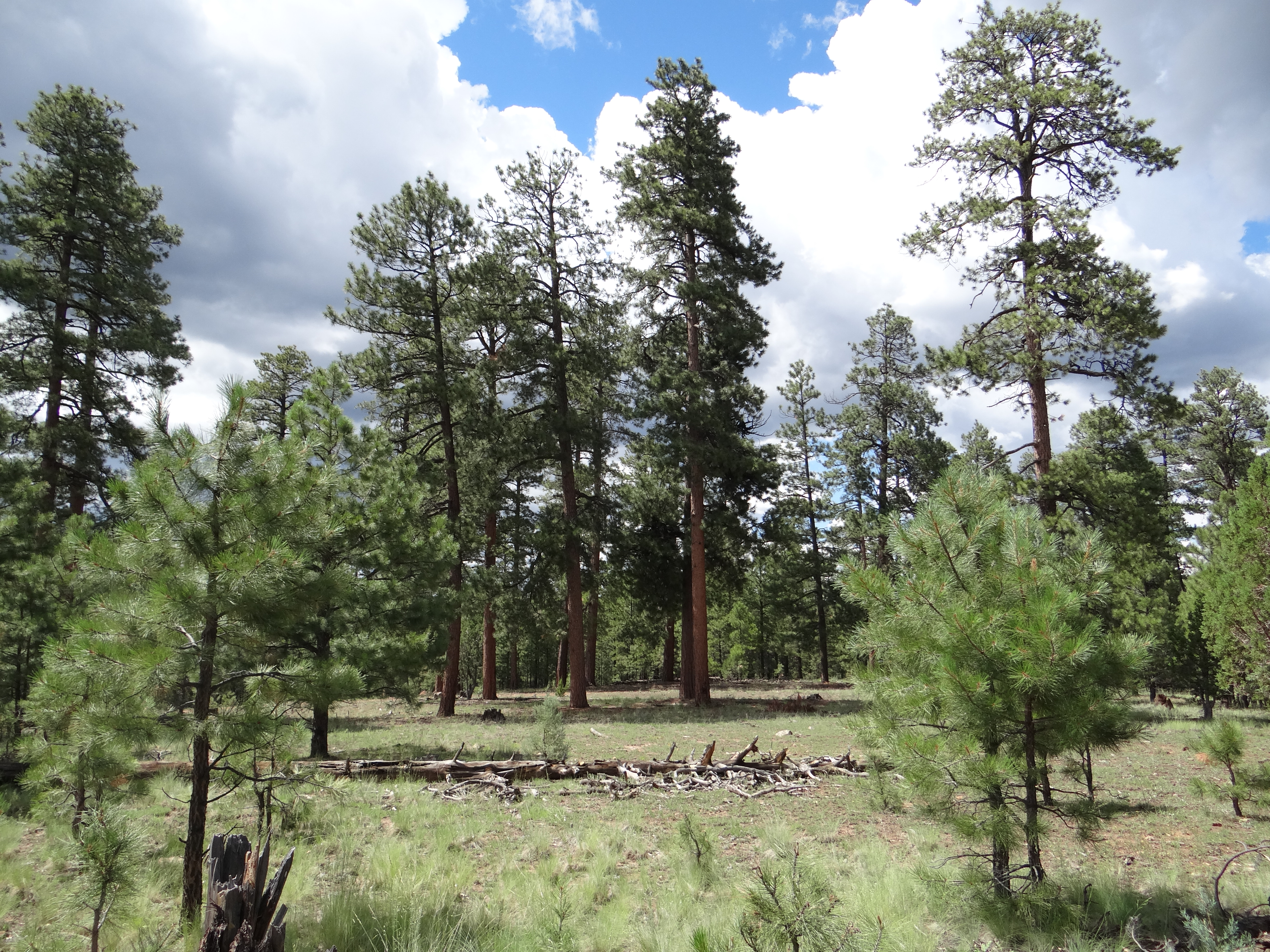
Ponderosa forest near Forest Lakes, Arizona.

Pinyon jays are residents from central Oregon to western South Dakota, south to northern Baja California, northwestern and east-central Arizona, central New Mexico, and western Oklahoma. They winter throughout their breeding range and irregularly from southern Washington to northwestern Montana, and south to Mexico and central Texas. When pinyon seed crops are poor, pinyon jays may wander to central Washington, northwestern Oregon, northern Idaho, northwestern Montana, throughout the Great Basin, Nebraska, Kansas, central-western and southwestern California, southeastern Arizona, central Texas, and northern Chihuahua. The pinyon jay is casual in Iowa and a sight report exists in Saskatchewan.

The pinyon jay is a permanent resident of pinyon-juniper (Pinus-Juniperus spp.) woodlands and low-elevation ponderosa pine (Pinus ponderosa) forests in the southwestern United States. Pinyon-juniper woodlands are composed primarily of Colorado pinyon (P. edulis) and Utah juniper (J. osteosperma) and cover vast acreages in Colorado, northern Arizona, Utah, and Nevada. Other pinyon and juniper species occurring in these woodlands include singleleaf pinyon (P. monophylla), Parry pinyon (P. quadrifolia), Mexican pinyon (P. cembroides), alligator juniper (J. deppeana), Rocky Mountain juniper (J. scopulorum), and California juniper (J. californica). The pinyon jay relies on singleleaf pinyon in the northwestern portion of its range and Colorado pinyon in the southeastern portion of its range. Ponderosa pines of the southwestern United States include interior ponderosa pine (P. p. var. scopulorum) and Arizona pine (P. p. var. arizonica). In this article, "pinyon" refers to both Colorado pinyon and singleleaf pinyon, and "ponderosa pine" refers to interior ponderosa pine and Arizona pine unless otherwise specified.

Pinyon jays prefer pinyon-juniper woodlands, and ponderosa pine forests. They interact in a mutual relationship with the pinyon. Pinyon trees provide pinyon jays with food, nesting and roosting sites, and breeding stimuli. Pinyon jays influence seed dispersal, establishment, and genetic structure of pinyon populations.

Pinyon jays use Colorado pinyon in the southeastern portion of their range and singleleaf pinyon in the northwestern portion of their range. The Colorado pinyon begins to bear cones at 25 years of age and produces "substantial" nut crops at an interval of 4 to 7 years, and sometimes every 3 to 5 years. Good cone crops tend to be localized and occur at irregular and infrequent intervals but are geographically synchronous, perhaps to counteract seed predation. Bumper seed crops of the Colorado pinyon are episodic and are probably linked to favorable climatic conditions.

Singleleaf pinyon may not produce cones until 35 years of age with a 2- to the 7-year interval between cone production years. The maximum seed production occurs when trees are 75 to 100 years old.

=== Climate ===
Pinyon-juniper woodlands are characterized as arid, semiarid, or occasionally, dry subhumid. The mean annual temperature varies from 40 to 61 °F (4 to 16 °C). The climate of ponderosa pine forests in the western United States is arid to semiarid. Weather is an important factor influencing the breeding success and survival of pinyon jays (see sections on mating and survival).

=== Precipitation ===
The annual mean precipitation in the pinyon-juniper woodlands of the southwestern United States varies widely, depending on elevation, topography, and geography. Precipitation ranges from 10 inches (250 mm) at low elevations to 22 inches (560 mm) at high elevations. Spring and summer are times of drought, and Colorado pinyon and juniper are highly drought resistant. Snow depths are not great, except at higher elevations and northern latitudes, but even then, melting occurs within a few days, especially on south-facing slopes. Ponderosa pine forests in the western United States experienced extreme variations in precipitation, receiving no snow some years and up to 100 inches (2,500 mm) in other years. Heavy spring snowfall in both habitats can create difficult nesting conditions for pinyon jays.

=== Elevation ===
Pinyon-juniper woodlands occur on foothills, mesas, plateaus and low mountains from 4,000 to 8,000 feet (1,200 to 2,400 m) elevation. Ponderosa pine forests in the western United States are most common from 6,000 to 8,500 feet (1,800–2,600). Pinyon jays have been noted foraging with Clark's nutcrackers (Nucifraga columbiana) at elevations up to 11,500 feet (3,500 m) in northern Arizona.

=== Soil ===
Pinyon-juniper woodlands occur in areas with a wide range of soils, with parent materials composed of limestone, lava, and sandstone. Soil textures range from coarse, rocky gravels to fine, compacted clays. Ponderosa pine forests in the western United States occur on igneous and sedimentary parent materials including basalt, volcanic cinder, limestone, and sandstone. Conifer seeds are buried by pinyon jays in areas sparsely covered with vegetation, with patches of bare soil and rocks, indicating well-drained soil.

== Behavior ==
Pinyon jays are highly social, often forming very large flocks of 250 or more birds, and several birds always seem to act as sentries for the flock, watching out for predators while their companions are feeding. The seed of the pinyon pine is the staple food but they supplement their diet with fruits and berries. Insects of many types are also eaten. The nest is always part of a colony but there is never more than one nest in a tree. Sometimes the colony can cover quite extensive areas with a single nest in each tree (typically juniper, live oak or pine). They spend most of their time searching for seeds to be eaten on the spot, hide in the ground, or store in a tree crevice to eat later. They utilize pinyon, western juniper and ponderosa pine trees for cover. Roosting sites rarely occur in the last area that was used for foraging that day. Before roosting, a flock of pinyon jays in northern Arizona flew 1 to 3 miles (1.6 to 4.8 km) from the feeding site. Roosting birds clumped together in groups of 3 to 5 individuals.

=== Mating ===
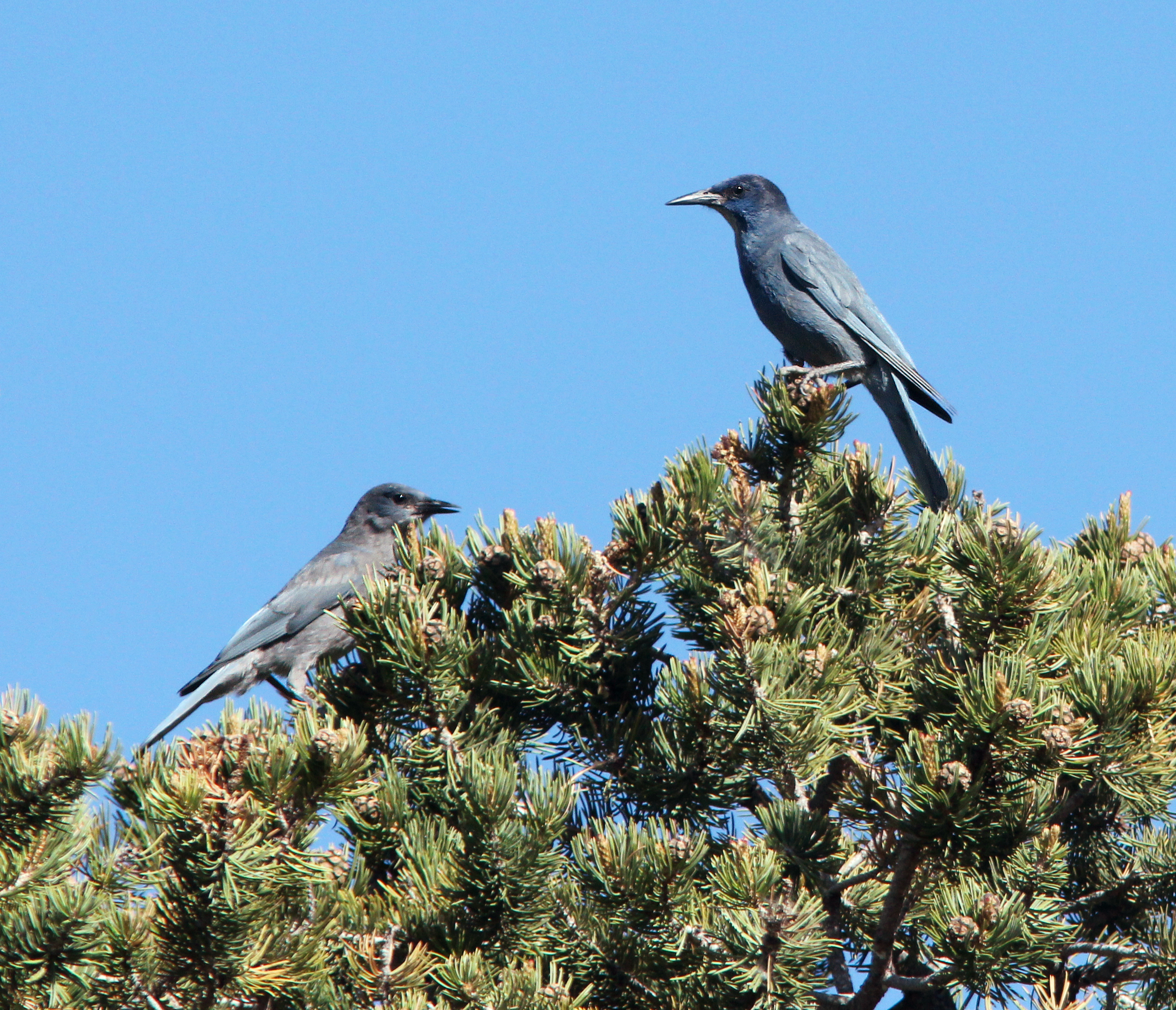
Pinyon jays perching in a tree.

Pinyon jays form large flocks that are maintained in a variety of forms throughout the year. The breeding season during January and February is the only time of the year when the composition of the flock changes dramatically. Two flocks are formed, 1 with breeding birds and 1 with yearling non-breeding birds. A 3rd flock may form at this time, composed of breeding pairs that were unsuccessful in their 1st breeding attempt in order to try a 2nd breeding attempt. Despite separation into separate flocks at times, a high degree of sociality continues to be maintained.

Pinyon jays appear to form perennial, monogamous pair bonds that last an average of 2.5 years. Breeding is initiated in males and females at 2 years and 1.56 years of age, respectively. Males average 1.63 mates/lifetime and females average 1.43 mates/lifetime.

Pinyon-juniper woodlands and ponderosa pine forests are utilized for reproduction. Pinyon jays are stimulated by increased photoperiod length and begin breeding in January or early February. Breeding may occur again in August based on the abundance of green Colorado pinyon cones and seeds, which stimulates and accelerates the growth of testes. Breeding activities from nest-building to the feeding of fledglings are related to the availability of conifer seeds and have been recorded for every month except December. Reproductive success may be maximized following large Colorado pinyon seed crops. These seed crops ripen at the end of August and enable pinyon jays to cache plenty of seeds and therefore breed sooner in the year, typically beginning in January. In years when bumper crops of pinyon seeds are available, pinyon jays have the opportunity to breed twice, in January or February and again in August. When the pinyon crop fails, pinyon jays forego late-winter breeding and instead breed in August when crops of pinyon seeds are ripe. "Courtship parties", consisting of all adult birds in the flock, are formed. Pinyon jays in these "courtship parties" fly several miles away from the group foraging area to breed in a colony.

A flock of 250 pinyon jays was studied in a ponderosa pine forest and adjacent pinyon-juniper woodland for 2.5 years near Flagstaff, Arizona. During January or February, the make-up of the pinyon jay flock changed dramatically as courtship activities increased. The flock was together in the early morning for foraging, then "courtship parties" flew up to 900 feet (270 m) away from the feeding flock for courtship activities. Courting pairs left and re-entered the main flock throughout the day.

=== Nesting ===
Nesting occurs from late February to April. Food availability is an important factor in the selection of nesting grounds. Nest building takes place in loose colonies and is synchronized among pairs in the "courtship party". During nesting, breeding pairs of birds roost with the main flock and feed as a unit for 1.5 hours each morning.

Nests are built in pinyon, western juniper (J. occidentalis), or ponderosa pine trees and are composed of twigs and shredded bark. Pinyon jays living in urban areas of Flagstaff, Arizona, were observed building their nests from trash, paper, and synthetic materials. Nests were built an average height of 18.4 feet (5.6 m) off of the ground in ponderosa pine trees with large amounts of cover above. Nests are built 50 to 500 feet (15 to 152 m) apart from each other.

Pinyon jays appear to be highly adaptive. For example, one study concluded that pinyon jays learned to modify their nest site location based on prior experience. Following at least 2 encounters with predators, pinyon jays learned to avoid building their nests in exposed areas of trees. Pinyon jays 7 or more years old learned to nest at low heights, enhancing concealment, and built their nests further out from the trunk early in the season in order to increase solar warming and reduce the energy costs of incubation.

Females typically incubate 3 to 5 eggs. Clutches measured in Flagstaff, Arizona, commonly contained 4 eggs, but in some years over 40% of all nests contained 3 or fewer eggs. Large clutches of 4 or more eggs were more common in years of abundant Colorado pinyon seeds.

During incubation, males leave the females and form their own feeding flock. Incubating females are fed pinyon and ponderosa pine seeds by their mates. Marzluff and Balda found that females were fed at a rate of about once every 73 minutes during incubation. Eggs are typically incubated for 17 days before hatching.

In a ponderosa pine forest near Flagstaff, Arizona, pairs of birds not successful in their 1st nesting attempt formed satellite nesting colonies composed of 3 to 12 nests in late April. These satellite colonies were scattered up to 0.75 miles (1.21 km) in all directions from the initial nesting location. Nest success increased with successive attempts; however, the number of young fledged per nest did not increase.

=== Fledging ===
In one study, the fledging of all young pinyon jays occurred no more than 6 days apart from different nests due to the synchronization of breeding. To protect fledglings from the cold, females remained on the nests continuously, and females and young were fed regurgitated ponderosa pine seeds. No more than 2 male birds fed nestlings for the first 12 to 15 days following hatching. Up to 7 adult male birds, probably sons of the nesting pair from the previous year, cooperatively fed nestlings during the last 4 days of nestling life and 20 days after leaving the nest. Some adult pinyon jays that were unsuccessful in their 1st and/or 2nd nesting attempts have been seen assuming a parental role for other young birds.

Young pinyon jays fledge approximately 3 weeks following hatching. Eight days after leaving the nest, the young learn to feed themselves a diet of mainly insects and soft plants. Pinyon seeds and ponderosa pine seeds are eaten as a reserve food. The fledgling's parents continue to feed them for up to 1 month, but at a reduced rate. Immature pinyon jays become independent at 8 weeks. After fledging, adults and young form a tightly knit feeding group until late summer. In the fall, juveniles of both sexes either become permanent members of the flock that they were born into, or leave to become members of other flocks. Young females usually leave their natal flock to find mates in new flocks and males stay with their natal flock to either breed or help their parents to breed.

=== Predators ===
Predation can be high for pinyon jays; however, flocking, colonial nesting, and mobbing may deter predators. In a study by Balda and Bateman, near Flagstaff, Arizona, 4–12 pinyon jays of a flock acted as sentinels, positioned at a high vantage point in a tree, waiting silently for an intruder while the flock was feeding. If an intruder approached, a warning call caused the flock to cease feeding and hide in the trees.

Pinyon jays have been seen mobbing great horned owls (Bubo virginianus), sharp-shinned hawks (Accipiter striatus), Cooper's hawks (A. cooperii), red-tailed hawks (Buteo jamaicensis), and gray foxes (Urocyon cinereoargenteus).

In a study conducted in Flagstaff, Arizona, 122 pinyon jays nests were located and studied between 1981 and 1986. The percentages of identified predation events on pinyon jays were: ravens and crows (Corvus spp.) 76.2%; Steller's jays, Abert's squirrels (Sciurus aberti), and rock squirrels (Spermophilus variegatus) 18.0%; ground predators including snakes, gray foxes, and domestic cats (Felis silvestris) 4.1%; and accipiters 1.6%. Mexican spotted owls (Strix occidentalis lucida) have also been seen consuming pinyon jays.

Incubating females are sometimes pulled from their nests at night. Female pinyon jays may be vulnerable to nocturnal and diurnal predators because they are extremely reluctant to leave their nests. Because pinyon jays breed in loose colonies, a predator attuned to finding nests could potentially specialize on incubating or brooding females.

=== Survival ===
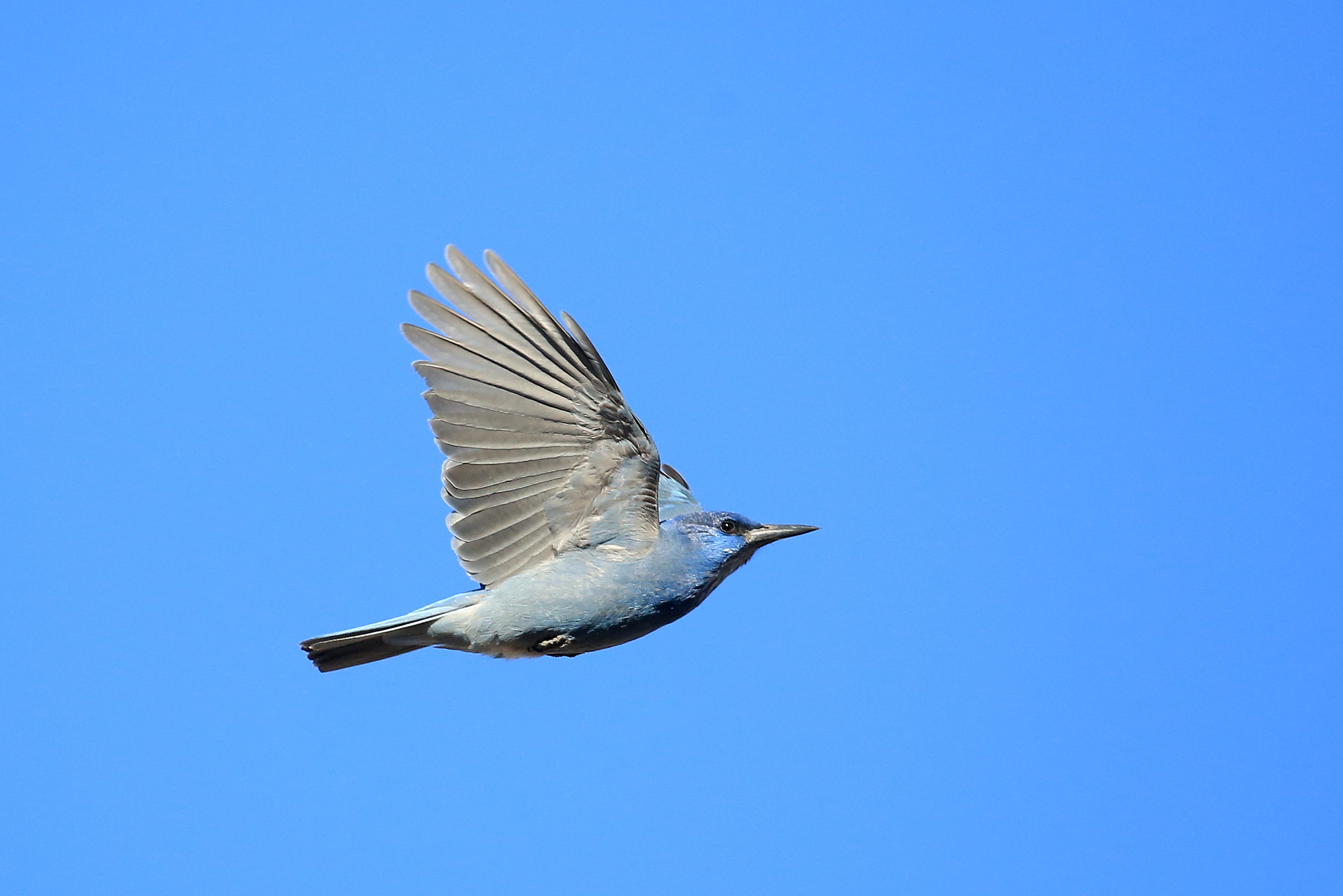
Pinyon jay in flight

In general, adults have a better chance of survival than yearlings and yearlings have a better chance of survival than juveniles. Nest failure is "high" during years when pinyons do not produce seeds. Breeding during late winter and early spring can produce fewer young that survive to maturity except in years following a major pinyon seed crop. Breeding for the 2nd time in August or September may result in high mortality of nestlings if the weather deteriorates rapidly in the late fall.

Marzluff and Balda studied 708 pinyon jays in Flagstaff, Arizona, from 1972 to 1984. The heaviest mortality of pinyon jays occurred in the fall, perhaps due to increased foraging activity in relatively unfamiliar areas, associated with the pinyon seed harvest. An average of 74% of adults, 62% of yearlings, and 41% of juveniles survived each year. Female pinyon jays experienced lower survivorship than males, perhaps because they perform the incubation and brooding.

In another study by Marzluff and Balda in Flagstaff, Arizona, survivorship of all age classes of pinyon jays was more strongly correlated with the weather than with pinyon seed crop variations. Juveniles and yearlings had a better chance of survival when spring weather was warm and wet and pinyon crops were large compared to snowy springs and poor pinyon seed crops. Adults survived better during warm, wet, spring weather also but experienced the highest survival during intermediate versus large pinyon seed crops. This may have been due to increased activity during harvest in large seed crop years and increased exposure to predators.

Following a study of 2 pinyon jay flocks near Flagstaff, Arizona, Clark, and Gabaldon suggested that nest desertions by adults may be a response to low-temperature thermal stress of nestlings. Broods too young to thermoregulate may die from low-temperature thermal stress when left unattended. This thermal stress may be responsible for nest desertions before the chicks die. Nest desertion may also occur following partial depredation of the nest because of the high probability that a predator may return. (Seed availability was naturally controlled for: One flock had to forage naturally, the other lived near bird feeders in Flagstaff; and indeed high seed supply did not prevent chick death.)

== Food habits ==
Pinyon jays are morphologically and behaviorally specialized to exploit pinyon seeds for food. Pinyon seeds are heavy and wingless, and not suited for wind dissemination. Their dispersal requires birds, animals, and humans. The seeds of the Colorado pinyon and singleleaf pinyon are very nutritious. Colorado pinyon seeds contain 14% protein, 62% to 71% fat, and 18% carbohydrate. Singleleaf pinyon seeds contain 10% protein, 23% fat, and 54% carbohydrate. Both contain all of the amino acids and abundant phosphorus, iron, vitamin A, and other nutrients. Pinyon cones require 3 growing seasons to mature; however, seeds within 1-year-old green cones can be eaten by the pinyon jay and are ripe by the end of August. Each cone contains approximately 20 seeds. Ponderosa pine seeds are also an important food for the pinyon jay.

In addition to pinyon and ponderosa pine seeds, pinyon jays eat Rocky Mountain bristlecone pine (Pinus aristata) seeds, limber pine (P. flexilis) seeds, and juniper berries. Insects such as caterpillar (Lepidoptera) larvae, beetles (Coleoptera), grasshoppers (Orthoptera), and ants (Hymenoptera) make up a large portion of their diet. Spiders (Araneae) are commonly eaten, and cultivated grains including corn, sorghum, beans, barley, oats, and wheat are consumed during winter months. Pinyon jays have also been noted ingesting soil around salt blocks for cattle.

Nestlings eat insects, soft plants, and pinyon seeds when they are plentiful.

=== Foraging behavior ===
Pinyon jays form flocks of 50 to more than 500 and occasionally thousands of individuals, that begin to forage together in late August. Flocking may be an adaptive strategy to increase search efficiency and reduce predation. Pinyon jays must travel long distances in search of cones during years when almost no pinyon or ponderosa pine cones are produced in an area. Different flocks may criss-cross each other within an area and keep in contact with vocalizations.

Flocks are sometimes formed with the hairy woodpecker (Picoides villosus), downy woodpecker (P. pubescens), northern flicker (Coloptes auratus), Clark's nutcracker, and European starling (Sturnus vulgaris) for a portion of the year, but these species are not important for the maintenance of the flock. The benefits of interspecific flocking are probably for protection from predators during feeding and to assist in locating locally abundant but scattered food.

Pinyon jays forage on the ground and in dead, fallen trees for insects and cached seeds. They also forage in the crevices of live trees for cached pinyon seeds, feed on the tips of ponderosa pine branches where new growth has occurred, and forage in the canopy for pinyon and ponderosa pine cones. If a cone is ripe but closed, the pinyon jay removes it to a place where it can be held open with the bird's feet. Then the bird hammers the cone open with its bill. Pinyon jays can differentiate between filled and empty seeds by a combination of color, weight, and the sound produced by clicking seeds with their bills. Pinyon jays can hold up to 43 ponderosa pine seeds and 56 pinyon seeds in their expandable esophagus.

=== Caching ===
Cached seeds provide energy for gonad development, courtship, nest building, egg laying and incubation. Pinyon jays travel up to 7.5 miles (12.1 km) to cache pinyon and ponderosa pine seeds for later use. Seed caching is most common in the fall. Cached Colorado pinyon seeds comprise up to 90% of the pinyon jay's diet from November through February. One to 7 seeds are placed in each cache, and a single pinyon jay can cache more than 20,000 seeds in 1 season. A flock of pinyon jays in New Mexico was estimated to cache 4.5 million seeds in 1 year. Pinyon jays may recache seeds to avoid seed theft by Steller's jays (Cyanocitta stelleri).

Seeds are cached on and off of the ground, depending on the season. Seeds are cached on the ground in areas with sparse vegetation and exposed, well-drained soils. Seeds are buried in the litter of dead needles and twigs, and between organic material and mineral soil. Seeds are cached close to the trunk of trees, most often on the south side where snow melts most quickly. Ground-caching stops when snow covers the ground.

Pinyon jays have been observed caching a significantly (P<0.01) greater number of seeds in above-ground sites during winter. Most seeds were cached in the crevices of tree bark. This was probably due to cold ground temperatures and snow accumulation.

A flock of pinyon jays occupying residential areas near Flagstaff, Arizona, was observed removing and caching sunflower seeds, Colorado pinyon seeds, peanuts, and millet from bird feeders.

Pinyon jays can remember specific locations where their conspecifics cached seeds for at least 2 days. They can remember general locations of cached seeds for at least 7 days. Observational spatial memory may have evolved as a consequence of cache dependence, as a consequence of caching in flocks, and/or a combination of the two.

=== Diet due to season ===
Pinyon jays forage mainly on pinyon seeds in late summer and ponderosa pine seeds in fall and early winter. A flock of pinyon jays in Flagstaff, Arizona, spent 80% of their time foraging in ponderosa pine forests in late November and early December, and 20% of their time foraging in both an open meadow dominated by grasses and forbs and pinyon-juniper woodlands. When the snow was present in the meadow, the flock spent 60% of its time in the pinyon-juniper woodlands where snow seldom covered the ground.

In the fall and winter, pinyon jays have been noted eating Gambel oak (Quercus gambelii) acorns in Gambel oak communities in New Mexico, Utah, and Arizona.

== Status and conservation ==
The pinyon jay is listed as Vulnerable by the International Union for Conservation of Nature. Between 1950 and 1964, an estimated 3 million acres of pinyon woodlands were destroyed or degraded, greatly decreasing the jays' range. Across the western United States, thinning, burning, and chemical treatments of pinyon-juniper woodlands have increasingly been employed to reduce wildfire risk or to improve the habitat for other species. In recent years, however, pinyon-juniper woodlands have expanded. Despite this, pinyon jay populations continue to decrease, indicating that habitat loss is not the main problem. Instead, climate-related impacts and increasing human development—particularly of oil and gas wells—across their range may have a greater impact on jay populations.
