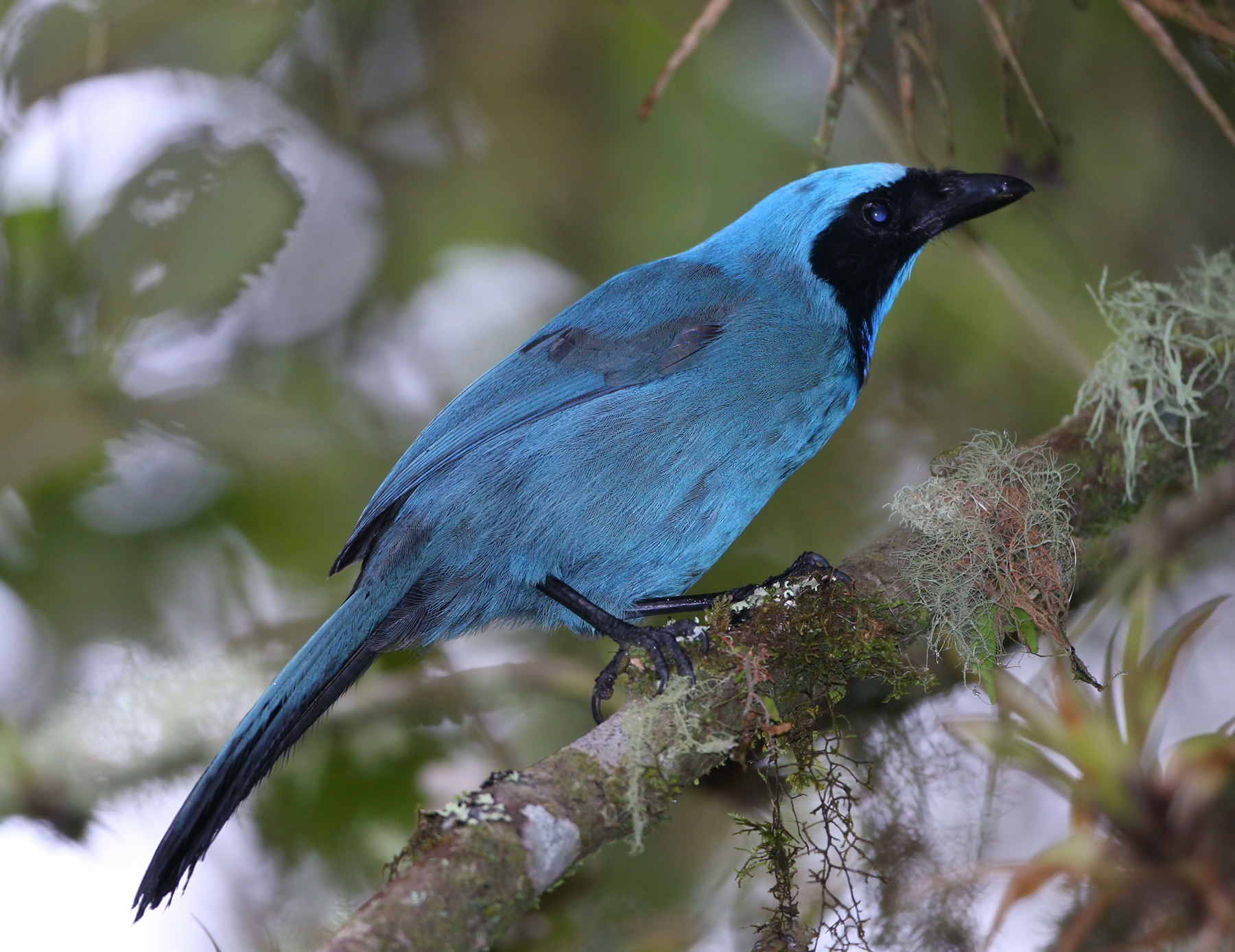
- Cyanolyca turcosa at Guango Lodge, Ecuador

Conservation status
- Least Concern (IUCN 3.1)

Scientific classification
- Kingdom: Animalia
- Phylum: Chordata
- Class: Aves
- Order: Passeriformes
- Family: Corvidae
- Genus: Cyanolyca
- Species: C. turcosa

Binomial name
- Cyanolyca turcosa (Bonaparte, 1853)

Synonyms
- Xanthura turcosa

= Turquoise jay =

Species of bird

The turquoise jay (Cyanolyca turcosa) is a species of bird in the family Corvidae.

The turquoise jay is a vibrant blue jay with a black face mask and collar. It is found exclusively in South America throughout southern Colombia, Ecuador, and northern Peru. The turquoise jay prefers a humid habitat of montane evergreen forest and elfin forest with both primary and secondary growth. This bird is omnivorous and is known to eat insects, berries, eggs, and young birds of other species. Turquoise jays are nonmigratory and tend to travel in mixed flocks.

== Taxonomy ==
=== Order and family ===
The order Passeriformes, commonly referred to as "perching birds", is the largest and most diverse order of birds. These birds are found worldwide, excluding Antarctica, but have their highest concentration in the tropics. Their sizes range from just a few grams to over a kilogram in weight, and they are generally colorful songbirds.

The family Corvidae is in the order Passeriformes and includes the jays, magpies, and crows. Most of the birds are strongly built, are stout-billed, and are some of the largest birds in Passeriformes. In most cases there exists no sexual dimorphism. Corvids have loud, harsh voices and an advanced social organization. Individuals in a colony will take care of one another and generally a pair will mate for life. Corvids are extremely intelligent and are resourceful scavengers. There are over 120 known species in the family Corvidae.

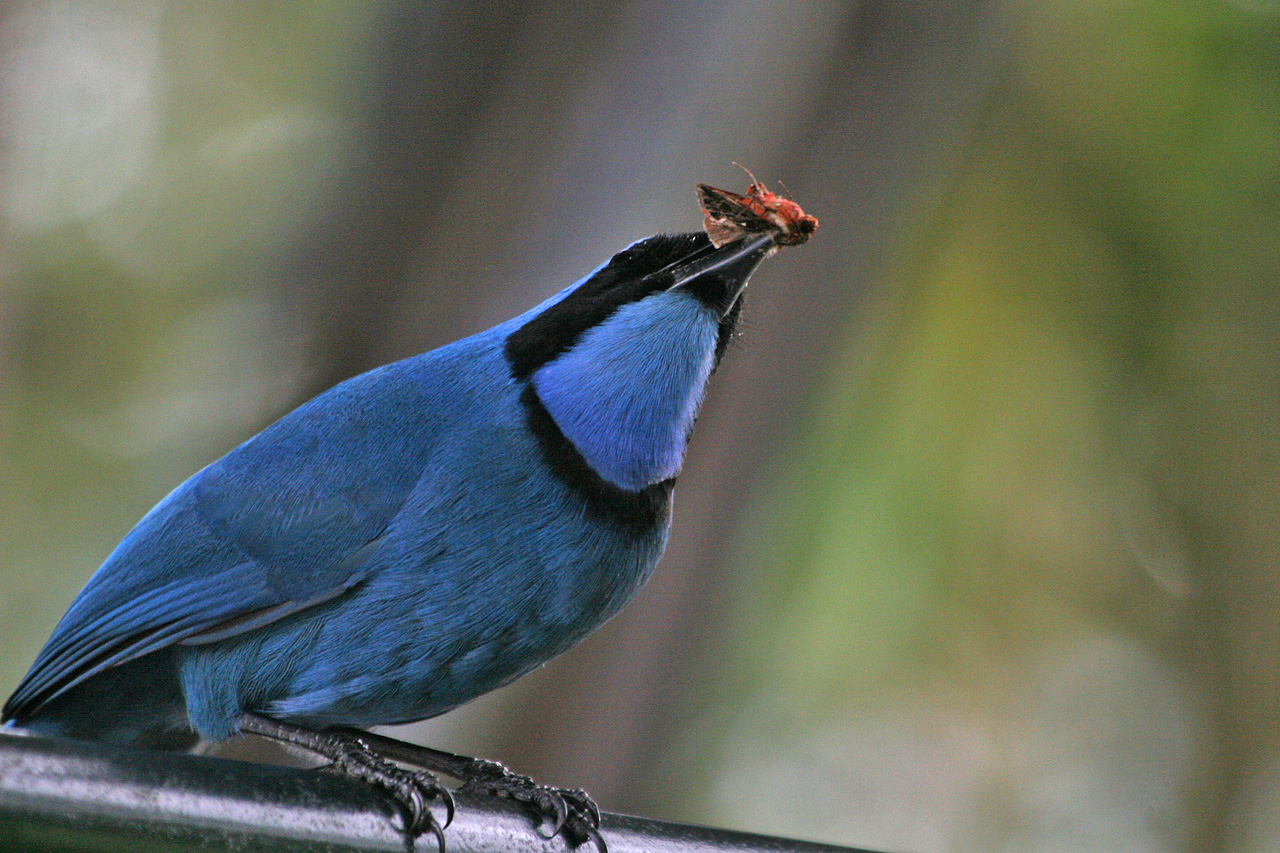
In the Bellavista Cloud Forest Reserve, Ecuador

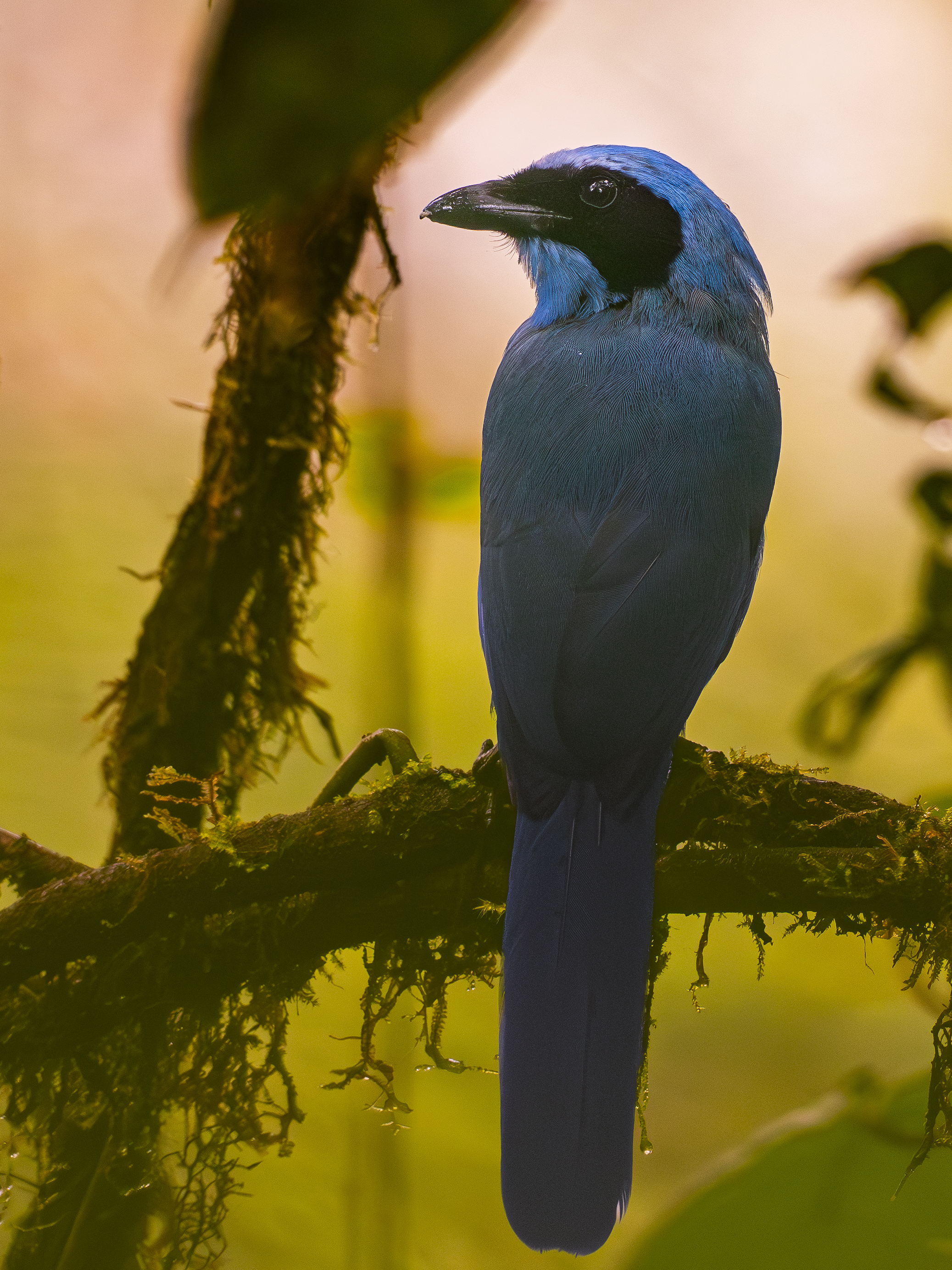
A perched turquoise jay showing its distinctive black mask in the Tandayapa Valley.

=== Related species ===
Similar species include the beautiful jay, the black-collared jay, and the white-collared jay. The turquoise jay is sympatric with the black-collared jay; both inhabit northwestern South America, though the black-collared jay is less green in color and has a much longer tail. The white-collared jay is also prevalent in northwestern South America, but differs in appearance from the turquoise jay by a white forecrown, black undertail, thin white collar, and general darker blue color. The beautiful jay is a rare jay that exists only on a thin strip of the western Andes between Colombia and Ecuador. It is different from the turquoise jay by a darker color overall, smaller size, and the absence of a black collar. The turquoise jay has no subspecies.

== Description ==
There exists no sexual dimorphism within the species. Adult turquoise jays are mainly a vibrant, blue-green color that can change depending on the lighting. The underside of the wings and tail are black. The turquoise jay has a thick, black face mask that extends to the auriculars and connects to a thin, black collar the wraps around the throat but does not extend around the nape of the neck. The forecrown of the turquoise jay is very light and almost white in color. The iris of the bird is brown while the legs, feet, and bill are all black. Juveniles have a duller color overall and lack the thin, black collar.

Measurements:

- Total Length: 32 cm
- Wing Length: 137 mm
- Tail Length: 142 mm
- Bill Length: 34 mm
- Tarsus Length: 39 mm

The primary vocalization of the turquoise jay is a short, descending whistle that is often heard in series. The tone of the whistle is loud and slightly hissy. Other sounds the turquoise jay can make include popping, squeaking, hissing, and static noises.

== Distribution and habitat ==
The turquoise jay is endemic to South America. It is found along the western Andes Mountains from southern Colombia to northern Peru, mostly at elevations between 2000–3000 feet, depending on the country; in Colombia, the turquoise jay is normally found between 2600–3000 feet, while in Ecuador it is found at elevations as low as 2000 feet. This bird prefers humid environments with densely tangled trees and shrubs and forests with primary or secondary growth. The turquoise jay is found in tall, montane evergreen forest and short elfin forest with thick vegetation. It is also found in semi-degraded habitats. The conservation status of this bird is rated "least concern" because the populations in its geographic range are relatively stable. This bird is considered common within its geographic range.

== Behavior ==
=== Diet ===
The turquoise jay is omnivorous. Though little is known about the diet, the jay is confirmed to eat insects, berries, eggs, and the young of other birds. Like other jays, the turquoise jay will explore the midstory and canopy of trees in search of food, examining the vegetation along the way.

=== Breeding ===
Little is known about the breeding habits of turquoise jays. The nests are generally constructed of moss and are built in the forks of branches near the crowns of trees. The areas in which nests are found are generally isolated and located centrally in the tree. Multiple individuals build the nest and care for the young. The male will generally feed and care for the female while she is incubating the eggs.
