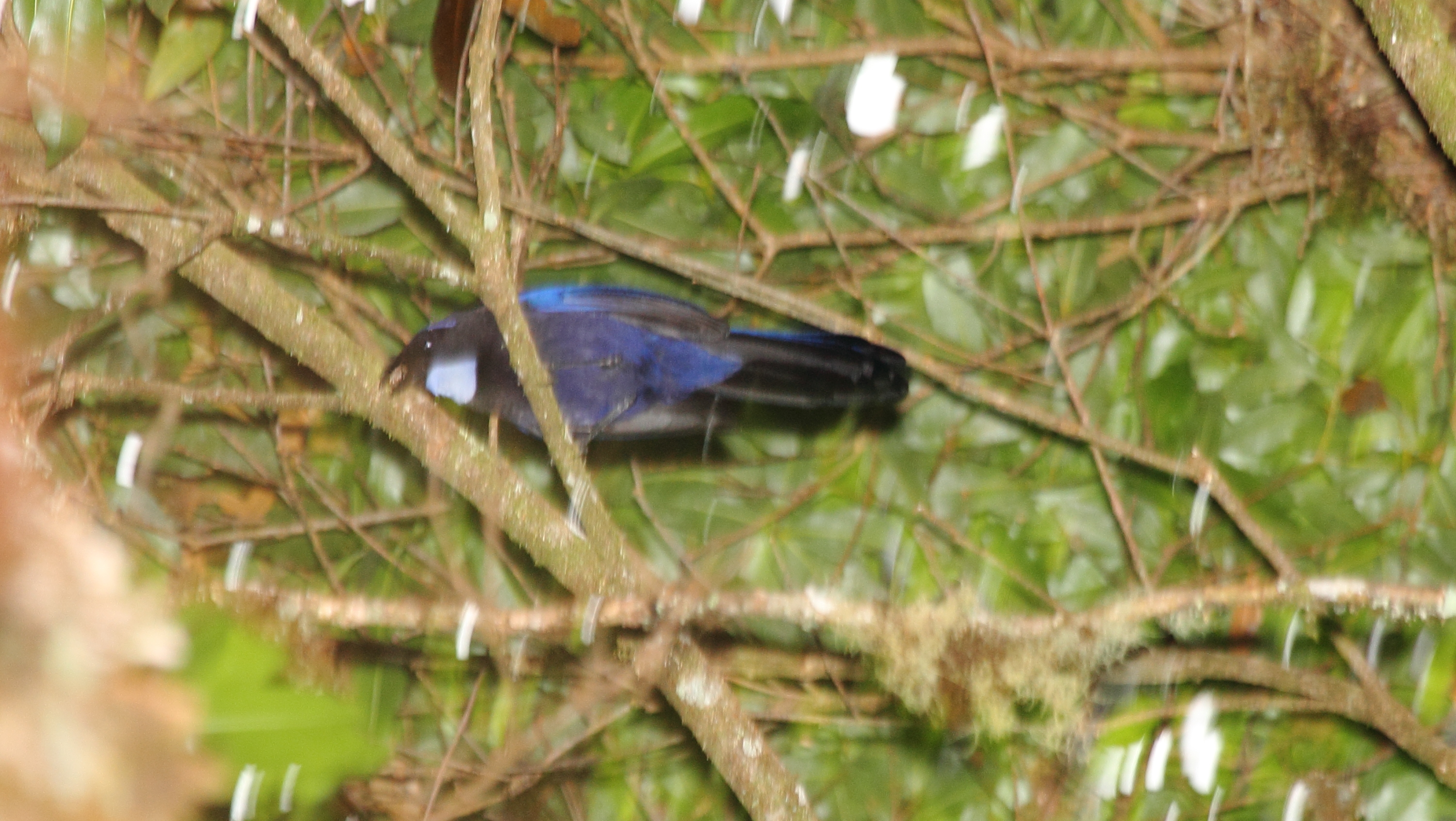
- Near Savegre, Costa Rica

Conservation status
- Least Concern (IUCN 3.1)

Scientific classification
- Kingdom: Animalia
- Phylum: Chordata
- Class: Aves
- Order: Passeriformes
- Family: Corvidae
- Genus: Cyanolyca
- Species: C. argentigula

Binomial name
- Cyanolyca argentigula (Lawrence, 1875)

= Silvery-throated jay =

Species of bird

The silvery-throated jay (Cyanolyca argentigula) is a species of bird in the family Corvidae, the crows and jays. It is found in Costa Rica and Panama.

== Taxonomy and systematics ==
The silvery-throated jay was originally described in 1875 as Cyanocitta angentigula. It was later reassigned to its present genus Cyanolyca that had been erected in 1851.

The silvery-throated jay has two subspecies, the nominate C. a. argentigula (Lawrence, 1875) and C. a. albior (Pitelka, 1951).

== Description ==
The silvery-throated jay is 25 to 27 cm (9.8 to 11 in) long and weighs an average of 65 g (2.3 oz). The sexes have the same plumage. Adults of the nominate subspecies have a mostly black head with a pale grayish lavender or silvery white band on the forecrown and rearward as a supercilium to the back of the ear coverts. Their upper back is black and their lower back, scapulars, rump, and uppertail coverts are dusky purplish blue. Their wings and tail are blue. Their throat and upper breast are pale lavender or silvery white. They have a black band across the lower breast that becomes dusky purplish blue on the belly and undertail coverts. Subspecies C. a. albior has a pure glossy white forecrown-supercilium strip with no lavender and a whiter throat and upper breast than the nominate. Juveniles have a faint or no stripe on the face and their crown is dusky purplish blue. Both subspecies have a dark brown to dark red iris, a black bill, and black legs and feet.

The only similarly patterned jay is the white-throated jay (C. mirabilis), which is endemic to Mexico.

== Distribution and habitat ==
The silvery-throated jay has a disjunct distribution. Subspecies C. a. albior is the more northerly of the two and has the smaller range. It is found in central Costa Rica's Cordillera Central. The nominate subspecies is found in the Cordillera de Talamanca from southern Costa Rica into western Panama's Chiriquí Province. The silvery-throated jay inhabits montane evergreen forest in the subtropical and lower temperate zones. Its habitat also includes oak forest, and it occurs in both the forest interior and on its edges. In elevation it ranges between 2,000 and 3,200 m (6,600 and 10,500 ft) in Costa Rica and between 1,500 and 3,000 m (4,900 and 9,800 ft) in Panama.

== Behavior ==
=== Movement ===
The silvery-throated jay is a year-round resident.

=== Feeding ===
The silvery-throated jay's diet is not known in detail but includes arthropods, small vertebrates like lizards and salamanders, and fruits. It forages in single-species flocks that in the non-breeding season may number up to 30 individuals. It forages mostly in the forest subcanopy and canopy but lower at the edges, moving deliberately and searching foliage, bromeliads, and mossy branches for prey.

=== Breeding ===
The silvery-throated jay's breeding season has not been fully defined but appears to span at least March to June in Costa Rica. Nothing else is known about the species' breeding biology.

=== Vocalization ===
The silvery-throated jay's principle vocalization is a "harsh nyah-nyah-nyah-nyah". It is also described as "a harsh, nasal, somewhat scratchy jew-jeah-jeah" and "a moderately loud, nasal chaak, cheuk, cheh". It scolds with "a harsher zhraaak" and gives a sharper "nyat nyat nyat" when taking off into flight.

== Status ==
The IUCN has assessed the silvery-throated jay as being of Least Concern. It has a small range; its estimated population of between 20,000 and 50,000 mature individuals is believed to be stable. No immediate threats have been identified. It is considered very uncommon in Costa Rica.
