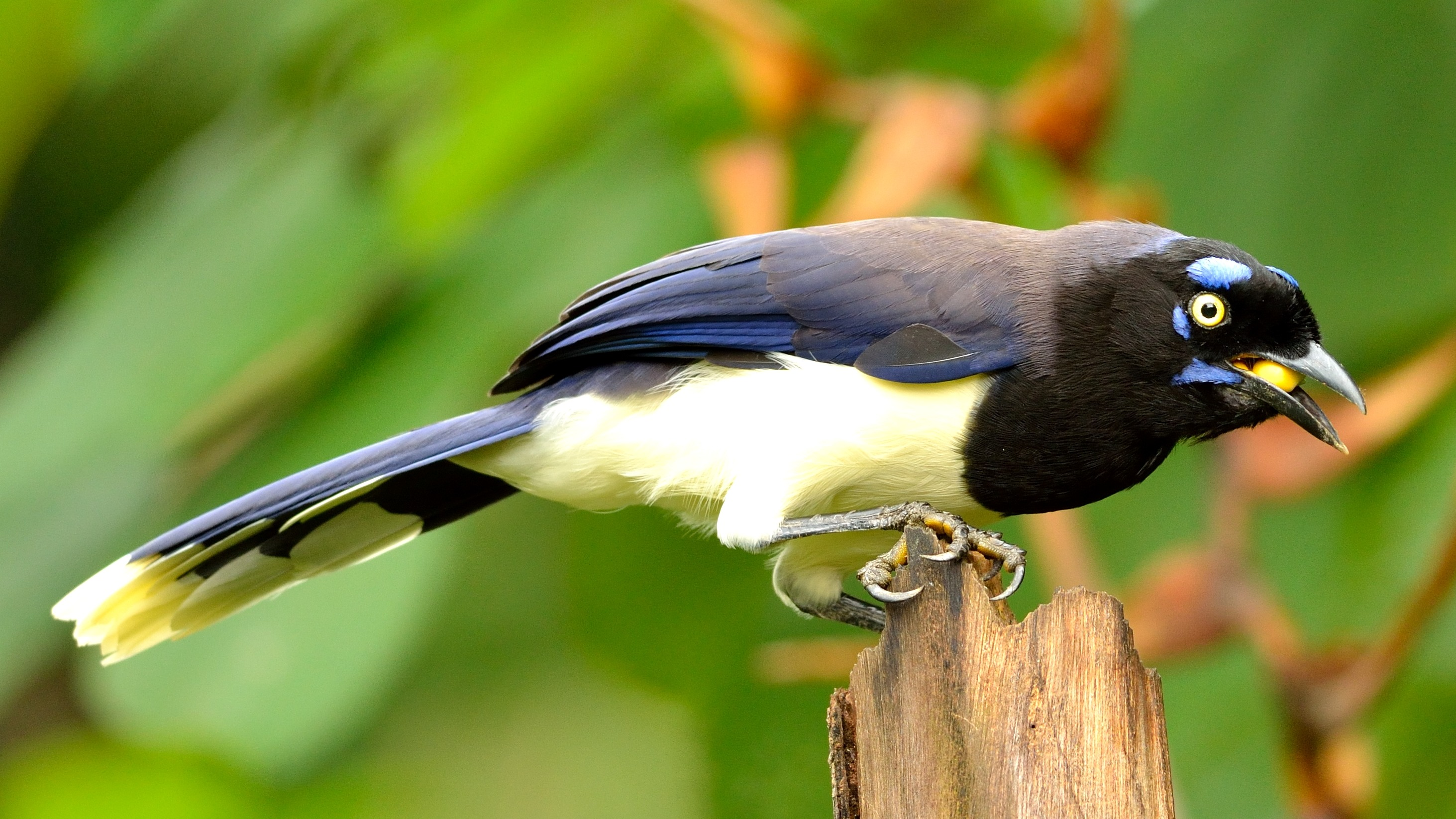
- A black-chested jay

Scientific classification
- Kingdom: Animalia
- Phylum: Chordata
- Class: Aves
- Order: Passeriformes
- Family: Corvidae
- Subfamily: Cyanocoracinae; Kaup, 1855

Type genus
- Cyanocorax F. Boie, 1826

Genus
- Aphelocoma; Cyanolyca; Cyanocitta; Cyanocorax; Gymnorhinus

= Cyanocoracinae =

Subfamily of magpies

Cyanocoracinae (the New World jay subfamily) is one of the six subfamilies of the crow family Corvidae. It is composed of 5 genera totalling 39 species.

- Cyanolyca (9 species)
- - Cyanocorax (20 species)
  - - Aphelocoma (7 species)
    - - Gymnorhinus (1 species)
      - Cyanocitta (2 species)
