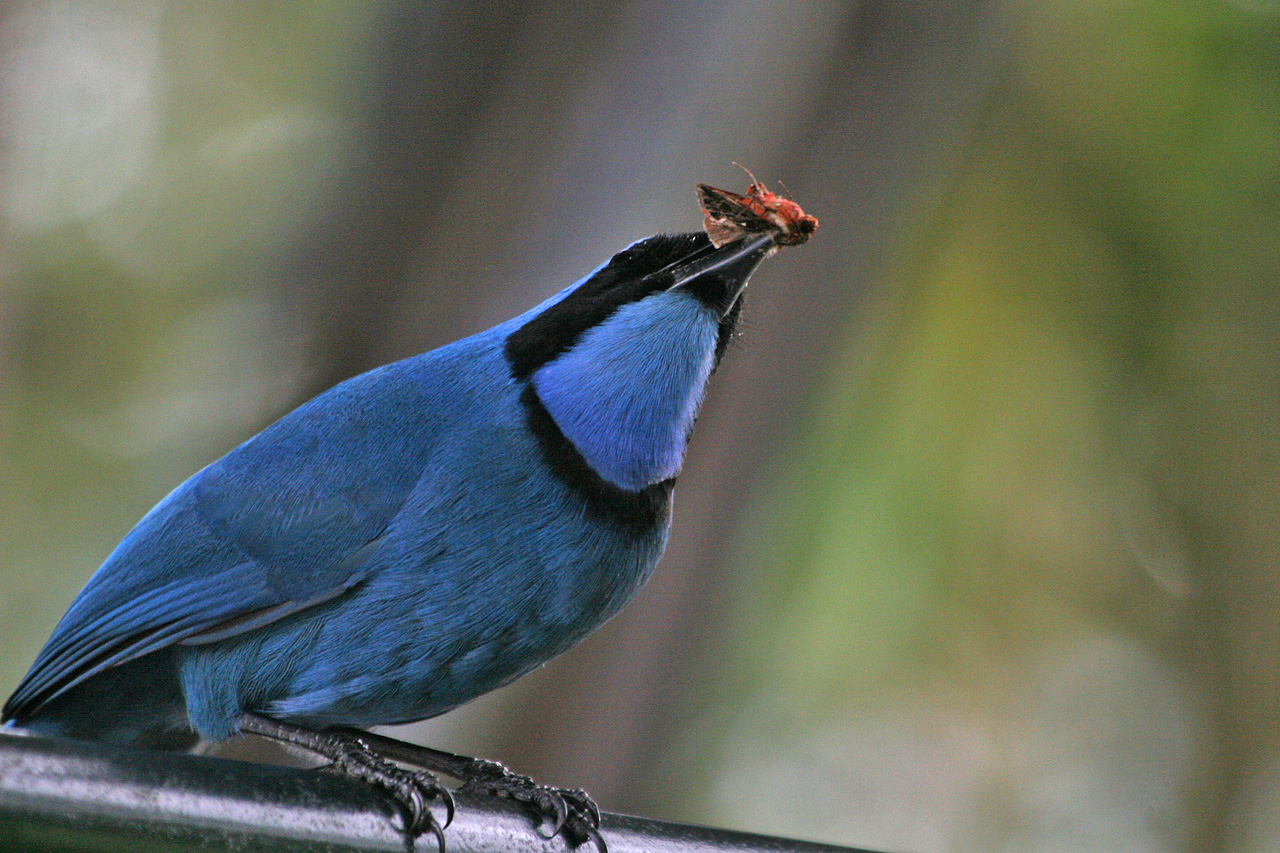
- Cyanolyca turcosa

Scientific classification
- Kingdom: Animalia
- Phylum: Chordata
- Class: Aves
- Order: Passeriformes
- Family: Corvidae
- Subfamily: Cyanocoracinae
- Genus: Cyanolyca; Cabanis, 1851

Type species
- Cyanocorax armillatus Gray, 1845

Species
- 9, see text

= Cyanolyca =

Genus of birds

Cyanolyca is a genus of small jays found in humid highland forests in southern Mexico, Central America and the Andes in South America. All are largely blue and have a black mask. They also possess black bills and legs and are skulking birds. They frequently join mixed-species flocks of birds.

== Taxonomy ==
The genus Cyanolyca was introduced in 1851 by the German ornithologist Jean Cabanis. The genus name combines the Ancient Greek κυανος/ kuanos meaning "dark-blue" with λυκος/lukos, a type of crow, perhaps the jackdaw, that was mentioned by Aristotle and Hesychius of Alexandria. Cabanis did not specify a type species but in 1855 George Gray designated the type as Cyanocorax armillatus Gray, 1845, the black-collared jay.

== Species ==
The genus contains nine species.

Image	Common name	Scientific name	Distribution
	White-throated jay	Cyanolyca mirabilis	
	Dwarf jay	Cyanolyca nanus	
	Black-throated jay	Cyanolyca pumilo	
	Silvery-throated jay	Cyanolyca argentigula	
	Azure-hooded jay	Cyanolyca cucullata	
	Beautiful jay	Cyanolyca pulchra	
	Black-collared jay	Cyanolyca armillata	
	Turquoise jay	Cyanolyca turcosa	
	White-collared jay	Cyanolyca viridicyanus	
