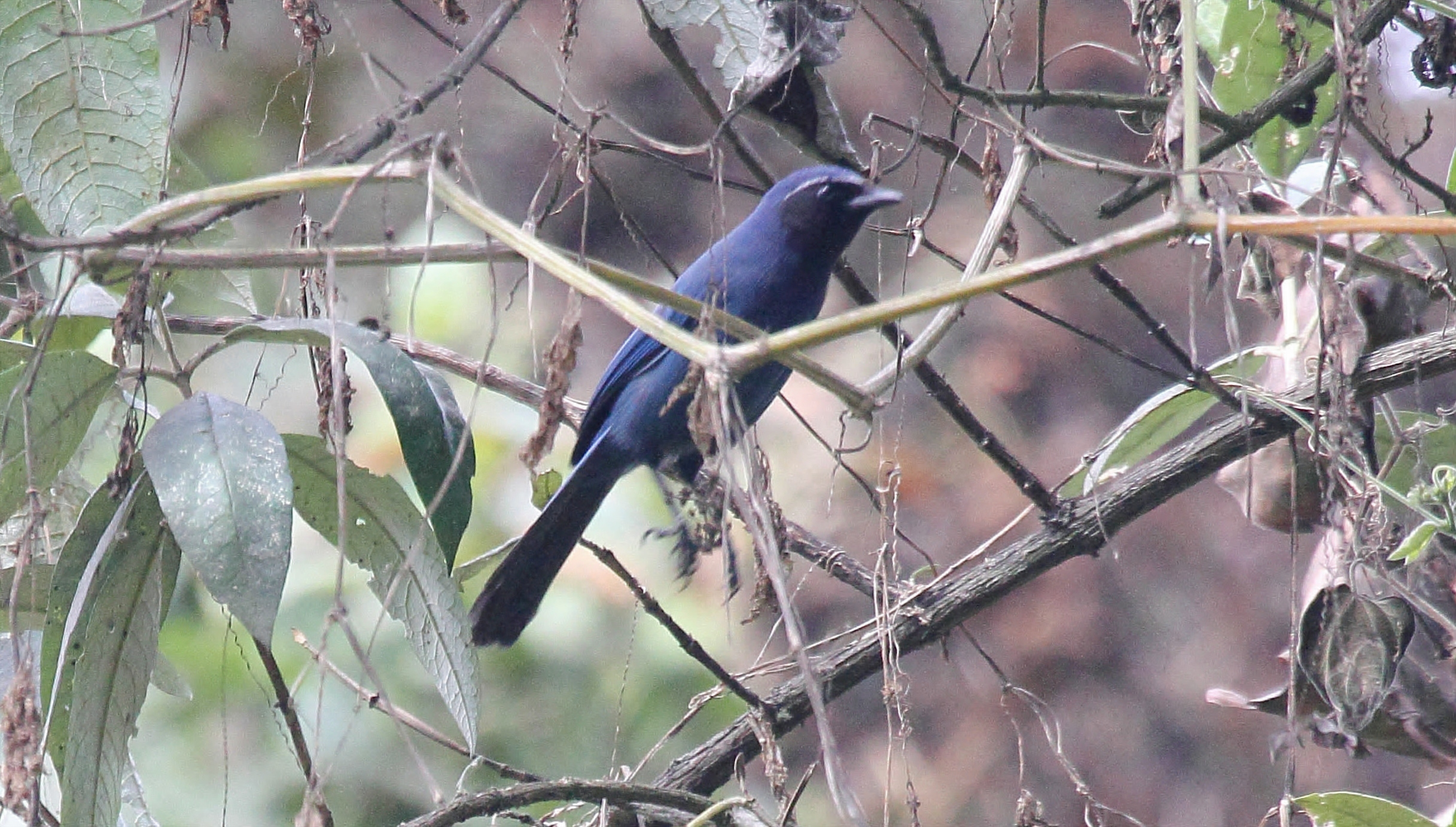

Conservation status
- Least Concern (IUCN 3.1)

Scientific classification
- Kingdom: Animalia
- Phylum: Chordata
- Class: Aves
- Order: Passeriformes
- Family: Corvidae
- Genus: Cyanolyca
- Species: C. pumilo

Binomial name
- Cyanolyca pumilo (Strickland, 1849)

= Black-throated jay =

Species of bird

The black-throated jay or Strickland's jay (Cyanolyca pumilo) is a species of bird in the family Corvidae, the crows and jays. It is found in Mexico, Guatemala and Honduras.

== Taxonomy and systematics ==
The black-throated jay was originally described in 1849 as Cyanocorax pumilo. It and several other species were later transferred to their present genus Cyanolyca. The black-throated jay is monotypic.

== Description ==
The black-throated jay is about 23 to 28 cm (9.1 to 11 in) long and weighs about 47 to 60 g (1.7 to 2.1 oz). The sexes have almost the same plumage; females tend to be slightly more greenish than males. Adults have a black forehead, lores, and sides of the head. Their crown is cobalt blue. They have a thin white line from above the forecrown to around the back of the ear coverts. Their upperparts are mostly deep blue that is less purplish than the crown and with some cerulean on the wings and tail. Their throat and chin are a duller black than their face. Their breast, belly, and undertail coverts are blue that is deeper and more purplish on the breast. They have a dark brown iris, a black bill, and black legs and feet. Immatures have a dusky grayish face and throat without the adult's white line.

== Distribution and habitat ==
The black-throated jay is found discontinuously in Mexico's Chiapas state, central and southern Guatemala, western and central Honduras, and extreme northern El Salvador. It inhabits montane evergreen cloudforest and pine-oak forest in the subtropical and lower temperate zones. Though some sources state that it ranges in elevation between 1,900 and 3,000 m (6,200 and 9,800 ft) another extends its lower limit to 1,200 m (3,900 ft).

== Behavior ==
=== Movement ===
The black-throated jay is a year-round resident.

=== Feeding ===
The black-throated jay's diet has not been studied; the species is believed to be omnivorous. It typically forages singly or in family groups and mostly in the forest's understory.

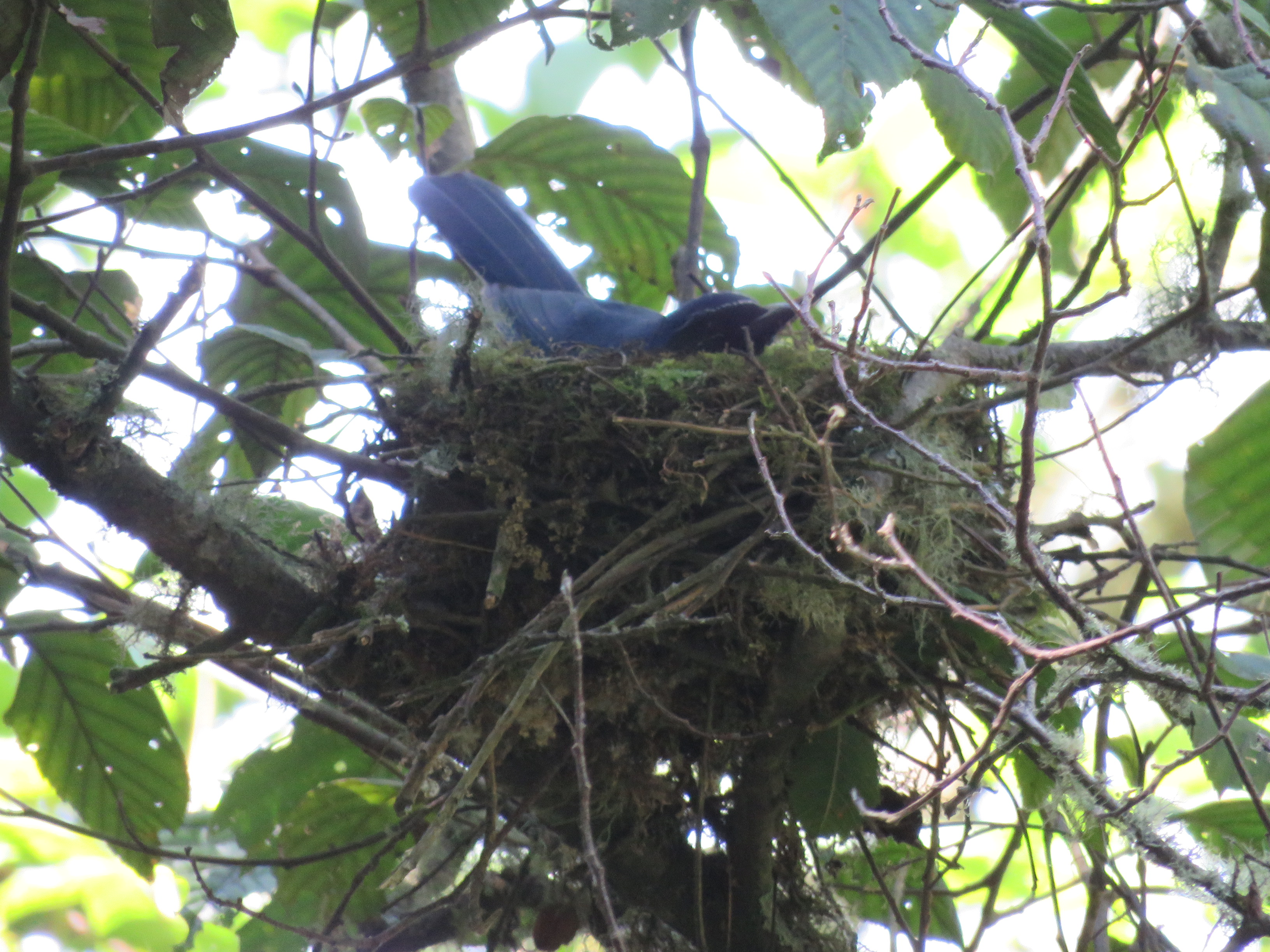
Black-throated Jay on nest, Union Reforma, San Marcos Department, Guatemala

=== Breeding ===
The black-throated jay's breeding season has not been defined but appears to span at least February to July. One nest was "built of twigs in [the] outer branches of tree canopy". Nothing else is known about the species' breeding biology.

=== Vocalization ===
The black-throated jay's calls include "a shrieking shreeaa'shreeaa–shreeaa'shreeaa–... [and] a harsher, drawn-out rhrrrrr or rhrrreee!".

== Status ==
The IUCN has assessed the black-throated jay as being of Least Concern. It has a large range; its estimated population of between 20,000 and 50,000 mature individuals is believed to be decreasing. No immediate threats have been identified. It is considered threatened in Mexico. In Guatemala and Honduras it is "[r]are to uncommon and local".
