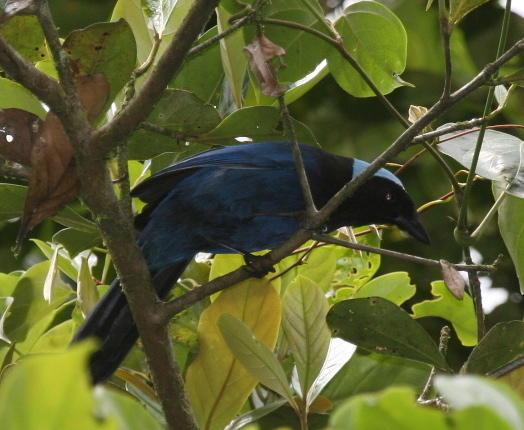
- San Gerardo, Alajuela, Costa Rica

Conservation status
- Least Concern (IUCN 3.1)

Scientific classification
- Kingdom: Animalia
- Phylum: Chordata
- Class: Aves
- Order: Passeriformes
- Family: Corvidae
- Genus: Cyanolyca
- Species: C. cucullata

Binomial name
- Cyanolyca cucullata (Ridgway, 1885)

= Azure-hooded jay =

Species of bird

The azure-hooded jay (Cyanolyca cucullata) is a species of bird in the family Corvidae. It is found in Middle America. Its natural habitat is subtropical or tropical moist montane forest. This species is known to have four subspecies. It is 11 to 12 inches (28 to 30 cm) in length and is dark blue with a black head and upper chest. The back of the head and neck are sky blue with a white border.

The jays travel in groups of two to ten individuals and may join mixed-species flocks. It is a secretive species and therefore difficult to observe in the wild. As an omnivore, this jay eats berries, seeds, and small, dead animals. Females lay three to four eggs, and the young fledge after twenty days. This species is listed as Least Concern, meaning it is not threatened with extinction.

== Taxonomy ==
The species was first described by the American ornithologist Robert Ridgway in 1885. Its specific epithet, cucullata, is the Latin word for "hooded". Its closest relative is the beautiful jay (C. pulchra) of Colombia and Ecuador; in his 1934 study, Hellmayr treated these species as conspecific. Phylogenetic analysis published in 2009 confirmed the close relationship between the two species; Bonaccorso speculates that the geographic (and subsequent genetic) separation between these species and others in the genus Cyanolyca may have been initiated by the formation of the Río Cauca Valley in western Colombia.

The azure-hooded jay has four subspecies. Cyanolyca cucullata mitrata is found in eastern Mexico, from San Luis Potosí to north central Oaxaca. This subspecies was initially treated as a separate species by Ridgway, but it was later merged into the azure-hooded jay. C. c. guatemalae ranges from southern Mexico in Chiapas to central Guatemala. C. c. hondurensis resides in western Honduras. C. c. cucullata, the nominate subspecies, is found in Costa Rica and western Panama.

== Description ==
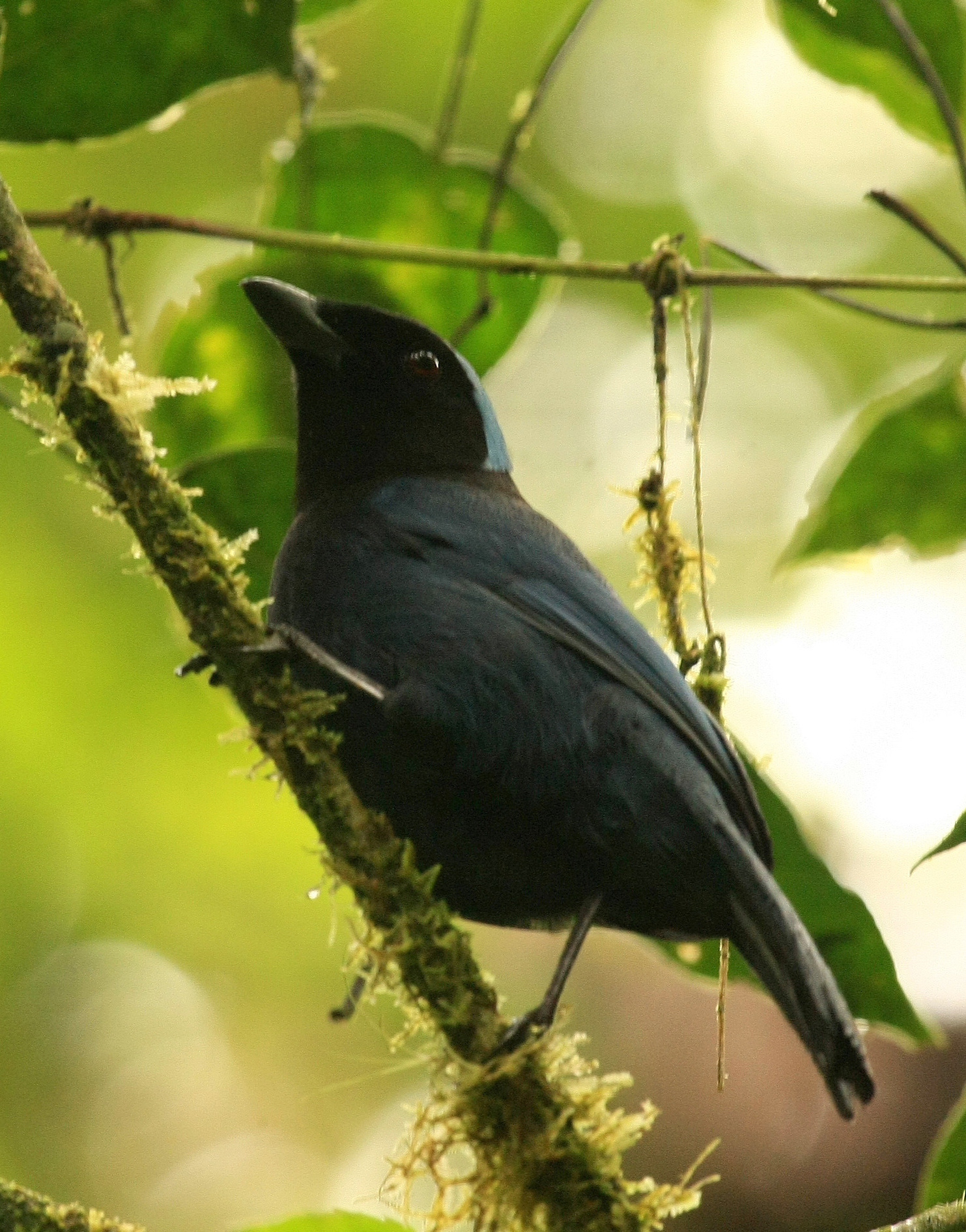
In Costa Rica

The azure-hooded jay ranges in length from 11 to 12 inches (28 to 30 cm), and it tends to weigh 3.52 ounces (100 g). Its large size and frame help the bird manage the large amount of flying it does. The adult is dark blue with black on the head and upper chest, while the rear of the crown and nape, or back of the neck, are sky blue with a white border. The legs and bill are black and the eyes are dark red. Both sexes are similar in appearance. Juveniles are duller than adults and their sky blue hood does not possess the white bordering.

Its voice has been described as a loud and bright eihnk-eihnk that is typically repeated four to five times. It is also known to repeat a nasal ehr-ehn or eh'enk noise twice and give off a low, gruff, hard cheh-r. The alarm and flock-social calls of this species, characterized as a reek! sound, are "nasal, querulous, and upwardly or double inflected."

== Distribution and habitat ==
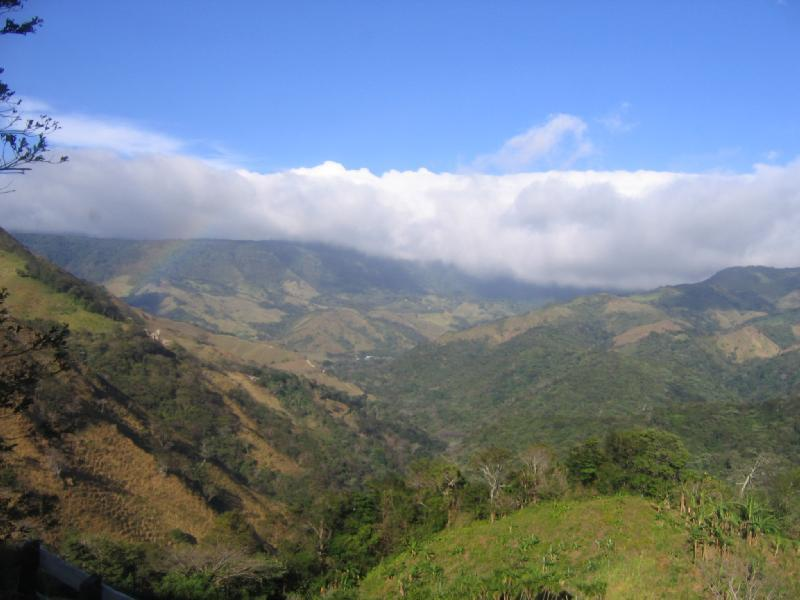
Costa Rica's Monteverde cloud forest, which the azure-hooded jay inhabits

This species is known from Costa Rica, Guatemala, Honduras, southeastern Mexico, and western Panama. It lives in humid evergreen forests that are sometimes interspersed with pine trees. It can be found at the edges of these forests typically in the middle and higher levels within these trees. It is also normally found only where cloud forest is uninterrupted.

== Ecology and behavior ==
This corvid is known to join mixed-species flocks with other species including unicolored jays and emerald toucanets. It is also known to travel in groups with two to ten other azure-hooded jays. It is a skulking and secretive species, rarely coming out into the open. Because of this habit, the bird is extremely difficult to observe in the wild and not much is known about its ecology. Mates are known to preen each other, a process which entails one bird bending over in front of the other and tugging on its throat feathers. The feathers of the crown are often moving swiftly, and it is believed that the condition of a mate can be determined by this movement.

Like other jays, this species is likely extremely intelligent. Similar species are known to use ants to keep their feathers clean, store seeds and nuts for later consumption, and use their toes to hold food. However, due to its secretive nature, these characteristics have not yet been observed in the species.

The bird's bright plumage makes it easy for predators to find this species. Whenever the jay feels threatened, it gives off a warning alarm call.

=== Diet ===
The azure-hooded jay is omnivorous, eating berries, seeds, and small, dead animals. This species has been known to steal and eat bait from traps set for small mammals. The bird tends to forage in the forest canopy.

=== Reproduction ===
The jay's nest is typically built 16.4 to 23 feet (5 to 7 m) above the ground next to a tree trunk. The base of the azure-hooded jay's first studied nest was coarsely made out of twigs that were 0.08 to 0.12 inches (2 to 3 mm) long. That nest was about 4.3 inches (11 cm) wide inside and 7.4 to 13 inches (19 to 33 cm) wide overall depending on the length of the exterior twigs. The nest is 2 inches (5 cm) deep and has an interior constructed with woven thin fibrils and twigs, and no feathers or other softening devices are used in the nest's construction. In addition to building its own nest, this jay is known to reuse old, abandoned nests made by other species. Three to four eggs are normally laid. The young are typically raised in the nest between April and June and they take at least 20 days to fledge. Both parents care for the young and feed them a variety of insects, including katydids. After the young fledge, they stay close to their parents.

== Conservation ==
This jay is treated as a species of Least Concern, or not threatened with extinction, by BirdLife International due to its large geographical range of about 42,500 square miles (110,000 km^{2}), population which, while unsurveyed, is believed to be above 10,000 individuals, and lack of a 30% population decline over the last ten years. However, the azure-hooded jay is uncommon in some parts of its range. It is also believed that deforestation may have an effect on this bird.

== Relationship with humans ==
Although this species has not been observed doing this, closely related jays are known to destroy and eat human-planted crops such as orchards, cane, pineapples, and potatoes. The azure-hooded jay has appeared on one stamp in Mexico in 1996.
