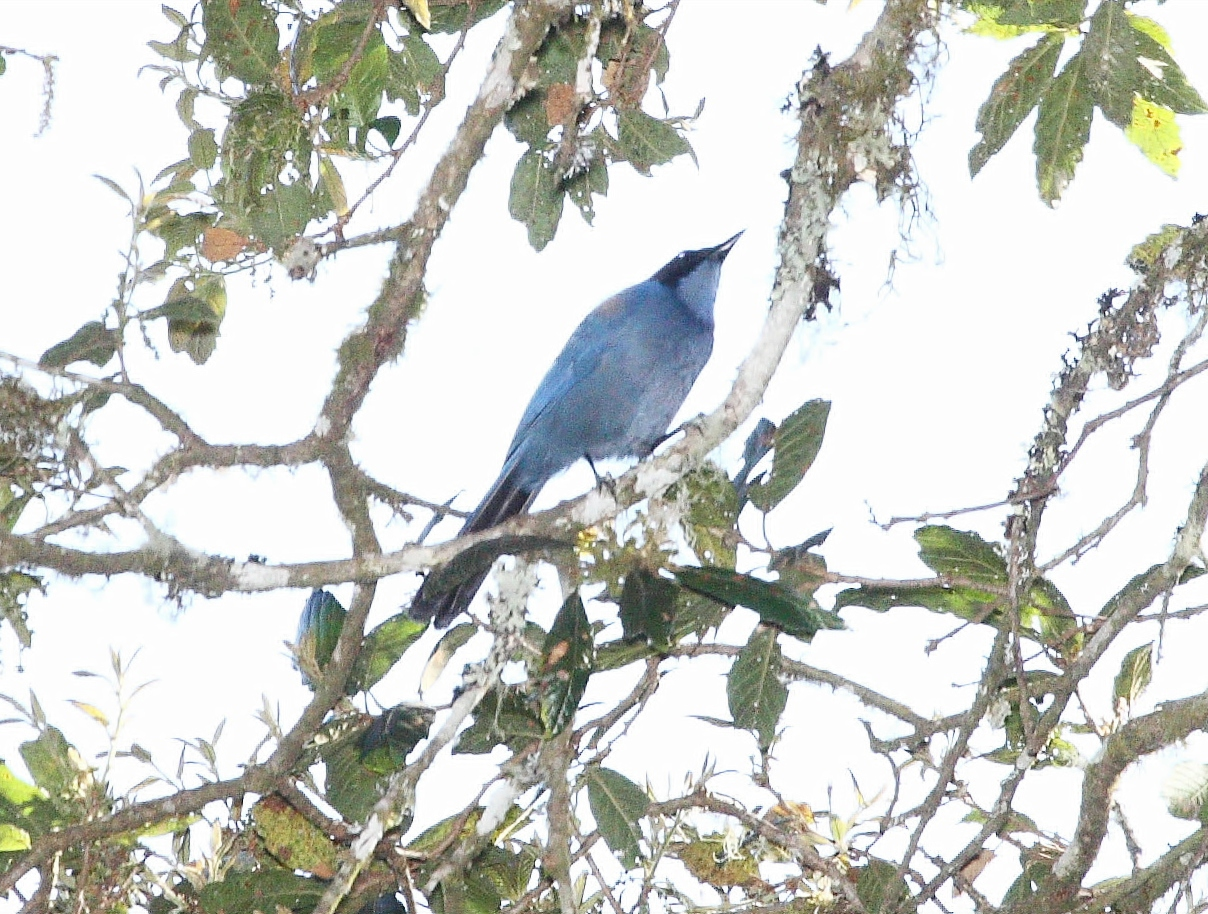

Conservation status
- Near Threatened (IUCN 3.1)

Scientific classification
- Kingdom: Animalia
- Phylum: Chordata
- Class: Aves
- Order: Passeriformes
- Family: Corvidae
- Genus: Cyanolyca
- Species: C. nanus

Binomial name
- Cyanolyca nanus (Du Bus de Gisignies, 1847)

= Dwarf jay =

Species of bird

The dwarf jay (Cyanolyca nanus) is the smallest bird in the family Corvidae, the crows and jays. It is endemic to Mexico, and is classified as Near Threatened by the IUCN Red List.

== Taxonomy and systematics ==
The dwarf jay was originally described in 1847 as Cyanocorax nanus. It was later reassigned to its present genus Cyanolyca that was erected in 1851.

The dwarf jay is monotypic.

== Description ==
The dwarf jay is the smallest jay in the Americas at 20 to 23 cm (7.9 to 9.1 in) long. Four individuals weighed 39 to 41.4 g (1.4 to 1.5 oz). The sexes have the same plumage though females tend to be duller than males. Adults have a black mask from the lores and chin to the cheeks and ear coverts. They have blue crown with a thin paler blue stripe separating it from the mask. Their upperparts are grayish or violet-blue that is brighter on the wings and tail. Their throat is pale purplish or whitish blue and the rest of their underparts grayish blue. The undersides of their wings and tail are grayish. They have a red brown iris, a black bill, and black legs and feet. Juveniles are duller overall than adults. They have no stripe between the crown and mask and their throat is grayish blue.

== Distribution and habitat ==
The dwarf jay is found intermittently in southeastern Mexico in southwestern Veracruz, far eastern Puebla, and northern Oaxaca states. It primarily inhabits humid pine-oak forest in the upper subtropical and temperate zones. It is also often in forest dominated by fir trees and in secondary forest near its preferred habitat. It greatly favors forest with a dense understory and subcanopy. Sources differ on its elevation range with 1,600 to 3,200 m (5,200 to 10,500 ft), 1,500 to 3,000 m (4,900 to 9,800 ft), 1,600 to 3,000 m (5,200 to 9,800 ft), and 2,500 to 3,050 m (8,200 to 10,000 ft) all being listed.

== Behavior ==
=== Movement ===
The dwarf jay is a year-round resident.

=== Feeding ===
The dwarf jay is believed to be primarily insectivorous though details are lacking. During the breeding season it typically forages in pairs but outside it is in mixed species feeding flocks of up to about 20 individuals. It forages mostly from the forest's mid-story to its lower canopy, agily seeking prey in vegetation, mosses, and in bark crevices, sometimes briefly hovering or hanging upside-down.

=== Breeding ===
The dwarf jay's breeding season begins with nest construction in March and apparently extends to July. Is nest is a large cup made from moss and lichens lined with pine needles and thin rootlets. Nest have been observed between about 3 and 15 m (10 and 50 ft) above the ground, typically in the crown of a tree or at a branch end. The clutch is two to three eggs that are pale greenish blue with olive markings. The incubation period is about 20 days but the time to fledging is not known. The female incubates the clutch, both parents provision nestlings, and only the female broods them.

=== Vocalization ===
The dwarf jay has a limited number of vocalizations compared to other jays. Its typical call is "a nasal shree’up, uttered in units of two or three or a nasal shiev'a shiev'a".

== Status ==
The IUCN originally in 1988 assessed the dwarf jay as Threatened, then in 1994 as Endangered, in 2000 as Vulnerable, and since 2019 as Near Threatened. It has a restricted and fragmented range; its estimated population of between 2500 and 10,000 mature individuals is believed to be decreasing. "Logging, agricultural expansion, firewood-gathering, road and tourist developments, sheep-ranching, intense grazing and intensive urbanisation have resulted in extensive and continuing destruction and fragmentation of the species’s [sic] habitat." It is described as "fairly common to common" and as "not uncommon".
