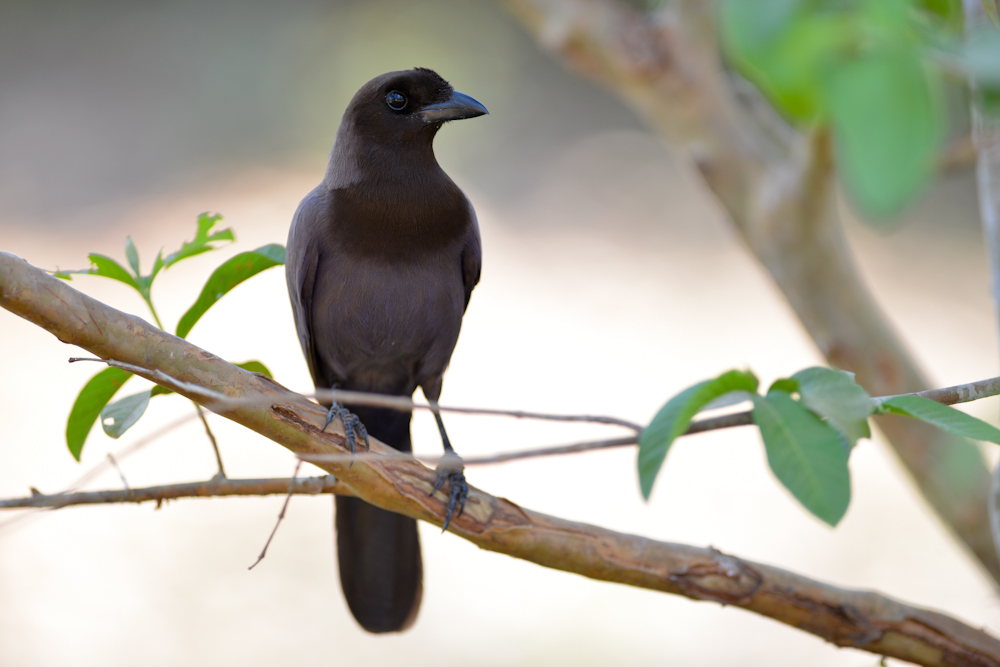
- Near Barão de Melgaço, Mato Grosso, Brazil

Conservation status
- Least Concern (IUCN 3.1)

Scientific classification
- Kingdom: Animalia
- Phylum: Chordata
- Class: Aves
- Order: Passeriformes
- Family: Corvidae
- Genus: Cyanocorax
- Species: C. cyanomelas

Binomial name
- Cyanocorax cyanomelas (Vieillot, 1818)

= Purplish jay =

Species of bird

The purplish jay (Cyanocorax cyanomelas) is a species of bird in the family Corvidae, the crows and jays. It is found in Argentina, Bolivia, Brazil, Paraguay, Peru, and as a vagrant to Uruguay.

== Taxonomy and systematics ==
The purplish jay was originally described in 1818 as Pica cyanomelas, mistakenly identifying it as a magpie.

The purplish jay is monotypic. Some authors treat the purplish jay and the azure jay (C. caeruleus) as a superspecies.

== Description ==
The purplish jay is 37 to 40 cm (15 to 16 in) long and weighs about 185 to 220 g (6.5 to 7.8 oz). The sexes have the same plumage and both have a tuft of feathers at the base of the bill. Adults have a sooty black forecrown, sides of the head, throat, and upper breast. Their crown is purplish brown that becomes more purple on the nape. The rest of their body is bluish purple with a brownish wash, with the brightest shade on the remiges and uppertail coverts. Their rectrices are a dark violet-blue. As the body feathers wear they become browner and contrast more with the tail than when fresh. The species has a dark brown iris, a black bill, and black legs and feet.

== Distribution and habitat ==
The purplish jay is found in southeastern Peru's Amazonas Department in the basin of the Madre de Dios River. Its range continues east across northern and eastern Bolivia into southern Brazil. From there it extends south through Paraguay into northern Argentina's Formosa, Chaco, Corrientes, and Misiones provinces. In Brazil its range's edge follows a rough line from southern Rondônia east across southern Mato Grosso and south across most of Mato Grosso do Sul. The species has also occurred as a vagrant in Uruguay.

The purplish jay inhabits a variety of landscapes including deciduous forest and woodlands, gallery forest, scrublands, and human-managed groves. In elevation it reaches 1,000 m (3,300 ft) in both Brazil and Peru.

== Behavior ==
=== Movement ===
The purplish jay is a year-round resident.

=== Feeding ===
The purplish jay feeds mostly on invertebrates and fruit but has been observed feeding on carrion. When eating fruit it discards the seeds, which germinate at a higher rate than those of intact fruits and those swallowed and passed by other feeders. It typically forages in family groups. It has been observed acting as a cleaner on a large mammal.

=== Breeding ===
The purplish jay's breeding season has not been fully defined but spans at least from early October into December. Its nest is a cup made from dry twigs with some smaller plant materials included. Nests have been found between about 3.7 and 6 m (12 and 20 ft) above the ground. Clutches of two to six eggs have been found but the typical clutch is three or four. The eggs are light blue with reddish brown splotches. The incubation period, time to fledging, and details of parental care are not known.

=== Vocalization ===
The purplish jay has a more limited vocal repertoire than many other jays. Its most frequently heard call is "a low, rough note, which may be given singly or in a series...described as "a low, rough DJEW or DJOW [or] jar-jar-jar-jar... or craa-craa-craa-craa". Other vocalizations include "a crowlike car-r-r, a chah chah and quaw".

== Status ==
The IUCN has assessed the purplish jay as being of Least Concern. It has a large range; its population size is not known and is believed to be stable. No immediate threats have been identified. It is considered "common to frequent" in Brazil and "locally fairly common" in Peru. "Human activity seems to be beneficial to these adaptable birds, which have been reported to feed on crops. Moreover, due to their tolerance for heavily degraded habitat, deforestation has actually expanded their range eastward into Brazil."
