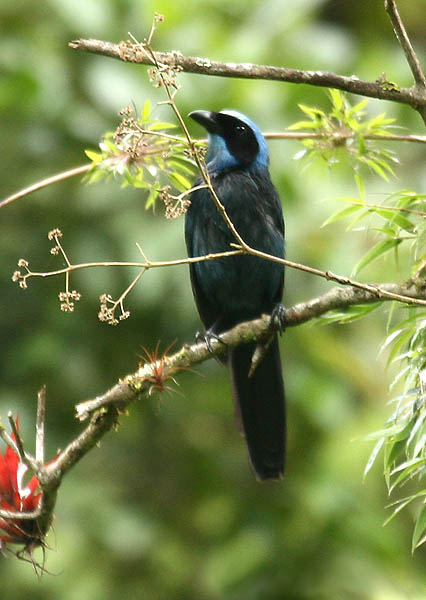
- In northwestern Ecuador

Conservation status
- Near Threatened (IUCN 3.1)

Scientific classification
- Kingdom: Animalia
- Phylum: Chordata
- Class: Aves
- Order: Passeriformes
- Family: Corvidae
- Genus: Cyanolyca
- Species: C. pulchra

Binomial name
- Cyanolyca pulchra (Lawrence, 1876)

Synonyms
- Cyanocitta pulchra (protonym)

= Beautiful jay =

Species of bird

The beautiful jay (Cyanolyca pulchra) is a species of bird in the crow and jay family Corvidae. It is closely related to the azure-hooded jay, and the two species are considered sister species. The species is monotypic, having no subspecies. The specific name for the beautiful jay, pulchra, is Latin for "beautiful".

It is found in Colombia and Ecuador, where its habitat includes humid montane forest and cloud forest. It can also be found around clearings and in secondary forest, but it is less common there. It often associates with watercourses and marshy areas within the forests. It ranges between 900–2,300 m (3,000–7,500 ft) above sea-level, but is most common between 1,400–1,800 m (4,600–5,900 ft).

The beautiful jay is 27 cm (11 in) long and in the male predominantly cyan-blue, becoming sky-blue almost to white from the neck to the forehead,. It has a black mask on the face meeting up with the dark -grey across the breast. The legs and bill are black. The female resembles the male but the upperparts have a brownish tinge, and juvenile birds have more brown on the plumage and are duller. It makes a range of calls, including a repeated "chew=chew-chew", clicks and whistles.

Little is known about the beautiful jay's behaviour. The species forages in the understory and is generally inconspicuous. Only one nest has been described so far, it is a cup constructed with sticks and decorated on the outside with moss and lined with thin plant fibres. The eggs are green with small brown blotches; in the only nest found so far the clutch size was two eggs. The chicks fledged 24 days after hatching.

It is becoming rare due to habitat loss. The species is uncommon and dependent upon primary forest. It is also sensitive to disturbance.
