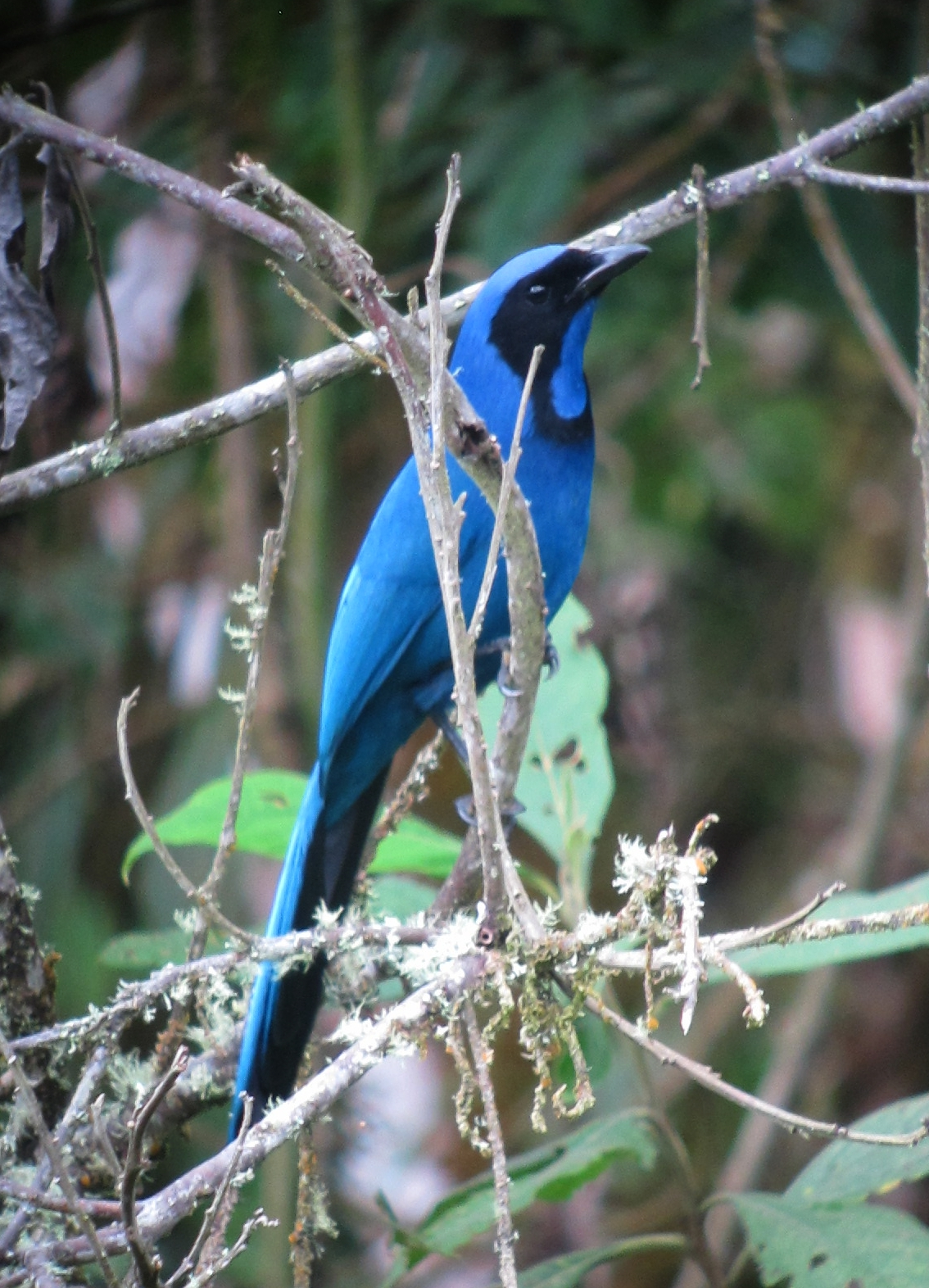

Conservation status
- Least Concern (IUCN 3.1)

- Least Concern (IUCN 3.1)

Scientific classification
- Kingdom: Animalia
- Phylum: Chordata
- Class: Aves
- Order: Passeriformes
- Family: Corvidae
- Genus: Cyanolyca
- Species: C. armillata

Binomial name
- Cyanolyca armillata (Gray, 1845)

Subspecies
- See text

Audio
- Song of black-collared jay

= Black-collared jay =

Species of bird

The black-collared jay (Cyanolyca armillata) is a species of bird in the family Corvidae, the crows and jays. It is found in Colombia, Ecuador, and Venezuela.

== Taxonomy and systematics ==
The black-collared jay was originally described in 1845 as Cyanocorax armillatus. It and several other species were later moved to their current genus Cyanolyca. The black-collared jay and the turquoise jay (Cyanolyca turcosa) were for a time treated as subspecies of the white-collared jay (C. viridicyanus) but they were separated beginning in the 1950s.

The black-collared jay's further taxonomy is unsettled. The IOC, AviList, and the Clements taxonomy assign it these three subspecies:

- Cyanolyca armillata armillata (Gray, 1845)
- Cyanolyca armillata meridana Sclater & Salvin, 1876
- Cyanolyca armillata quindiuna Sclater & Salvin, 1876

However, BirdLife International's Handbook of the Birds of the World (HBW) treats quindiuna as a separate species, the Quindio jay, and retains the English name "black-collared jay" for the other two subspecies. Clements does recognize the taxon within the species as the "black-collared jay (Quindio)". At least one nineteenth centur author called the taxon Xanthura quindiuna.

This article follows the one-species, three-subspecies model.

== Description ==
The black-collared jay is 30 to 32 cm (12 to 13 in) long and weighs about 100 g (3.5 oz). The sexes have the same plumage. Adults of the nominate subspecies C. a. armillata have a violaceous-blue crown and nape. Their forehead, lores, and sides of the head are black. Their throat and middle of the upper breast are ultramarine with a thin black border that connects to the rear of the black face. Most of the rest of their plumage is cyan-blue. The inner edges of their primaries are dark brown and the undersides of their wings and tail are blackish. Subspecies C. a. meridana is slightly darker and more purplish blue than the nominate. C. a. quindiuna is larger than the nominate. Its crown and nape are darker (more similar to its back color) and its body, wings, and tail have a greenish tinge. Juveniles are duller than adults and have a grayer throat and more grayish body feathers that have blue only on their tips. All subspecies have a dark brown iris, a black bill, and black legs and feet.

== Distribution and habitat ==
The subspecies of the black-collared jay are found thus:

- Cyanolyca armillata armillata: Andes from southern Táchira in western Venezuela south in Colombia's Eastern Andes to Cundinamarca Department
- Cyanolyca armillata meridana: Andes of western Venezuela from northern Táchira north through Mérida into Trujillo
- Cyanolyca armillata quindiuna: primarily in Colombia's Central Andes from Antioquia Department south slightly into northern Ecuador; also in Colombia at northern end of the Western Andes and the Eastern Andes north to Huila Department

The black-collared jay inhabits the interior and edges of cloudforest, elfin forest, and mature secondary forest, especially in areas with much bamboo and tree ferns. In elevation it ranges between 1,600 and 3,200 m (5,200 and 10,500 ft) in Venezuela and Colombia and between 2,100 and 3,150 m (6,900 and 10,300 ft) in Ecuador.

== Behavior ==
=== Movement ===
The black-collared jay is a year-round resident.

=== Feeding ===
The black-collared jay feeds mostly on insects and also includes some fruits in its diet. It typically forages in pairs or small flocks and sometimes joins mixed-species feeding flocks. It forages mostly in the forest's subcanopy and canopy.

=== Breeding ===
Nothing is known about the black-collared jay's breeding biology.

=== Vocalization ===
The black-collared jay has a large repertoire of vocalizations which are generally "short and often musical notes, including ‘falsetto’ notes". They include "a rising, almost twanging hrwee, various shrill rising and falling notes, a sharp, stuttered jet-jtjtjtjt, a low guttural wowr, and a soft, liquid craa [and also a] schree, in alarm a sharp staccato upward-inflected reek!, a soft chattered croooh, and a peep".

== Status ==
The IUCN follows HBW taxonomy and so has separately assessed the black-collared jay sensu stricto (armillata + meridana) and the "Quindio jay" (quindiuna). Both have large ranges. The size of neither population is known but both are believed to be stable. No immediate threats to either has been identified. "Forested habitat within the [two ranges] is currently not at risk, as tree cover loss is very low." The black-collared jay is considered uncommon in Venezuela, fairly common in Colombia, and "very rare and apparently local" in Ecuador. It is found in at least one protected area in Venezuela and several in Colombia.
