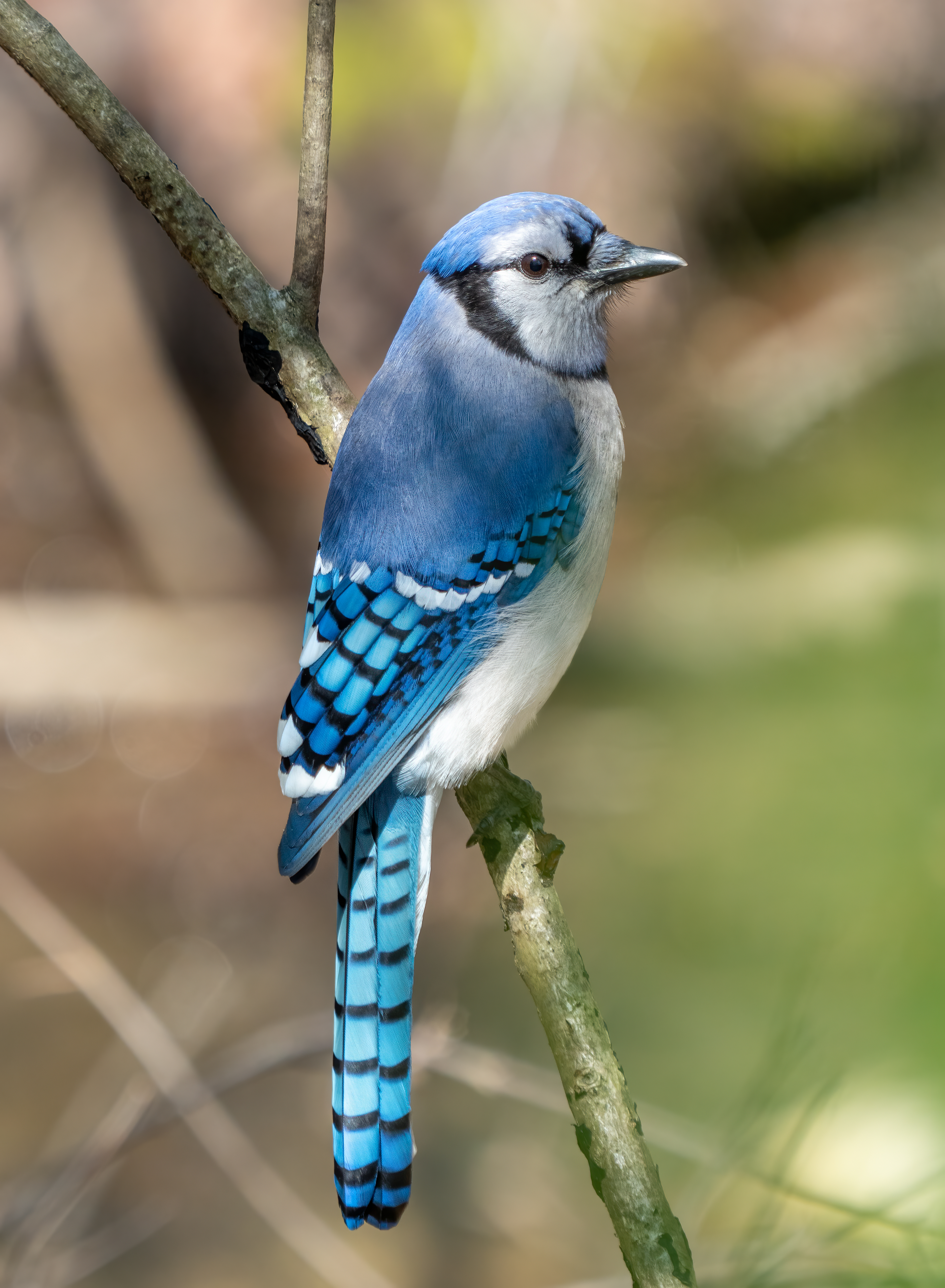
- Blue jay (C. cristata)

Scientific classification
- Kingdom: Animalia
- Phylum: Chordata
- Class: Aves
- Order: Passeriformes
- Family: Corvidae
- Subfamily: Cyanocoracinae
- Genus: Cyanocitta; Strickland, 1845

Type species
- Corvus cristatus Linnaeus, 1758

Species
- Cyanocitta cristata; Cyanocitta stelleri
- Distribution of the Cyanocitta jays in North America. Red: Steller's Jay (Cyanocitta stelleri), black: Blue Jay (Cyanocitta cristata). Dotted line: irregular wintering, dashed line: irregular breeding.

= Cyanocitta =

Genus of birds

Cyanocitta is a genus of birds in the family Corvidae, a family which contains the crows, jays, and magpies. The genus includes two jays with blue plumage and a distinctive feather crest: the blue jay and Steller's jay. Found only in temperate North America, the Rocky Mountains divide the two species. These jays inhabit deciduous, mixed, and coniferous forests, feeding mainly on seeds, invertebrates, and small vertebrates, with occasional human food. As omnivores, they breed from spring to early summer, nesting in treetops or bushes with clutches of three to six eggs. They are the only American corvids that use mud in nest-building. Despite their similarities, the two species differ in migratory behavior, socialization, and mating habits.

== Description ==
Crested jays are relatively slender corvids with similar body shapes but differ in size. Steller’s jay is larger than the blue jay. Their strong black beaks have a small hooked tip and minimal bristles. They have slightly rounded, medium-to-long tails and relatively short wings. A feathered crest is more pronounced in Steller's jay. Both species are blue, black, and white with distinct black-banded tails and wings—a unique trait among American corvids. Males are slightly larger, but both sexes have similar coloring.

=== Flight ===
Steller’s jay has powerful, steady wing beats, while the blue jay’s long-distance flight includes flatter beats, alternating with gliding over short distances. Both species prefer hopping over walking on the ground and are agile in trees.

=== Vocalization ===
Crested jays have diverse vocal repertoires, from croaks and energetic calls to melodic sounds. Both species are skilled imitators, mimicking buzzard calls, other birds, mammals, and even mechanical noises. The purpose of this mimicry in the wild is still debated.

== Systematics ==
Established by Hugh Edwin Strickland in 1845, it contains the following species and subspecies:

Genus Cyanocitta – Strickland, 1845 – two species
Common name	Scientific name and subspecies	Range	Size and ecology	IUCN status and estimated population
Blue jay	Cyanocitta cristata (Linnaeus, 1758) Four subspecies: C. c. bromia; C. c. cristata; C. c. cyanotephra; C. c. semplei	Eastern Canada, eastern and central United States	Size: 25–34 cm, 70–100 g Habitat: coniferous forest and scrub habitat Diet: seeds and nuts, such as acorns, soft fruits, arthropods, and small vertebrates.	LC
Steller's jay	Cyanocitta stelleri (Gmelin, JF, 1788) Thirteen subspecies: C. s. stelleri (Gmelin, JF, 1788); C. s. carlottae Osgood, 1901; C. s. frontalis (Ridgway, 1873); C. s. carbonacea Grinnell, 1900; C. s. annectens (Baird, SF, 1874); C. s. macrolopha Baird, SF, 1854; C. s. diademata (Bonaparte, 1850); C. s. phillipsi Browning, 1993 \ C. s. azteca Ridgway, 1899; C. s. coronata (Swainson, 1827); C. s. purpurea Aldrich, 1944; C. s. restricta Phillips, AR, 1966; C. s. suavis Miller, W & Griscom, 1925	west of the Rocky Mountains	Size: 30–34 cm, 100–142 g Habitat: coniferous forests Diet: seeds, nuts, berries and other fruit, invertebrates, small rodents, eggs	LC

The name Cyanocitta is a combination of the Greek words kuanos, meaning "dark blue", and kitta, meaning "jay".

== Distribution ==
Crested jays inhabit temperate North America, divided by the North American Cordillera. This distribution likely resulted from glaciation during the last ice age. The blue jay occupies the flat eastern regions up to the Rocky Mountains, while the Steller's jay is found in the western mountains and adjacent temperate areas. Both species overlap only in southwestern Canada, reaching the warm temperate zone's northern edge in Canada and Alaska. They are absent in arid deserts, valleys, and coastal regions, with distribution becoming more fragmented to the south. Only the Steller's jay extends into tropical regions, inhabiting cooler mountains as far south as Nicaragua. During the Pleistocene, it likely persisted in ice-free southern and western areas, spreading into the Rockies post-glaciation.

The two species differ in migratory habits: the Steller's jay is primarily resident, moving only from high altitudes in winter, while the blue jay migrates seasonally, especially from northern regions. In southern areas, like Florida, blue jays are resident. Steller's jays may migrate more widely after breeding seasons if food is scarce, with many juveniles moving to peripheral areas.

=== Habitat ===
Crested jays prefer open forests, forest edges, parklands, and urban green spaces, showing a strong preference for oak trees when available. Both species thrive in coniferous and mixed forests, with blue jays also frequenting pure deciduous forests. Blue jays adapt well to urban areas, often reaching higher densities than in forests, while Steller's jays are less common in human-populated areas, preferring altitudes between 1,000 and 3,500 meters. Blue jays, in contrast, range widely, from coastal beaches to the Appalachian Mountains.
