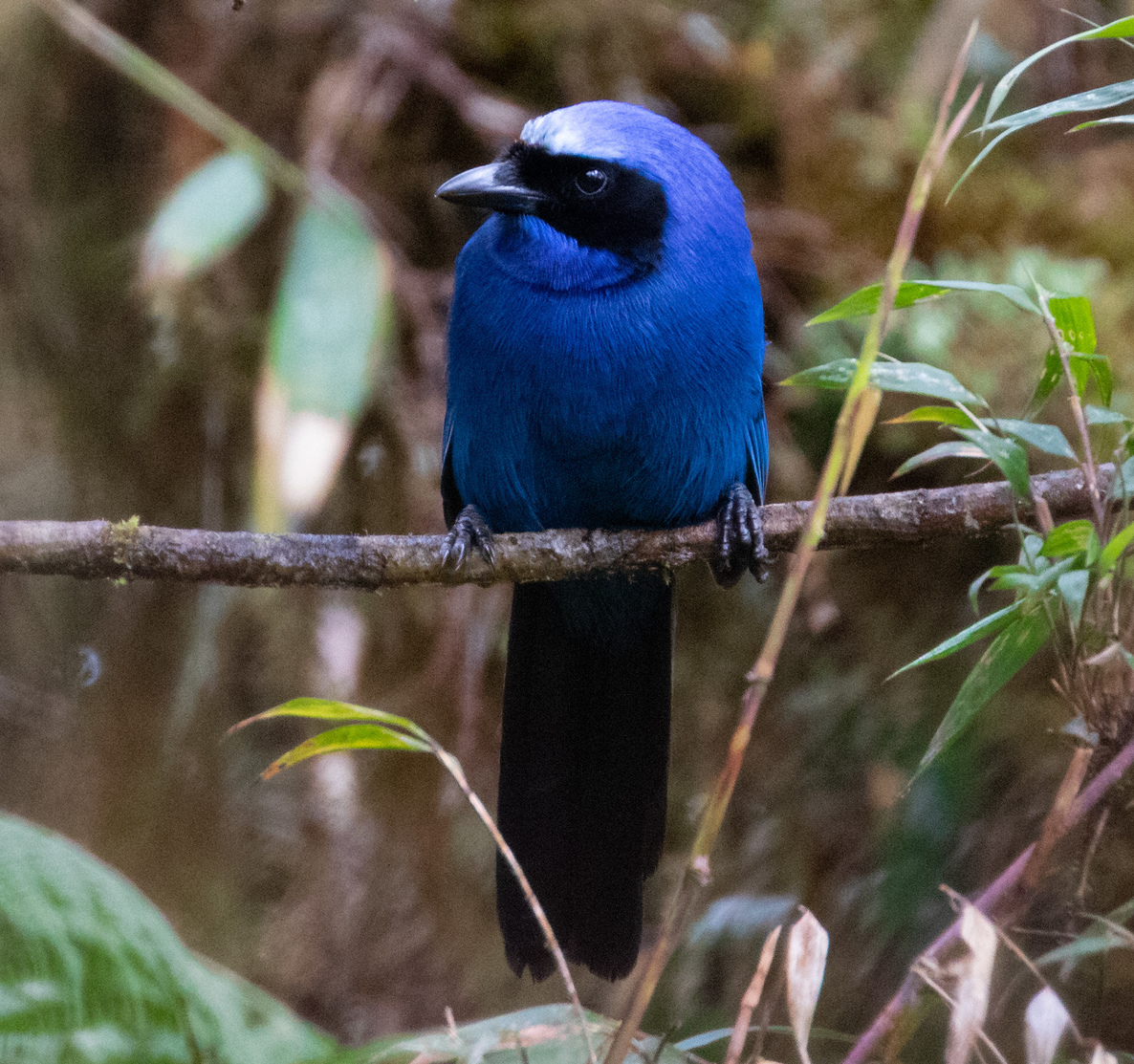

Conservation status
- Least Concern (IUCN 3.1)

Scientific classification
- Kingdom: Animalia
- Phylum: Chordata
- Class: Aves
- Order: Passeriformes
- Family: Corvidae
- Genus: Cyanolyca
- Species: C. viridicyanus

Binomial name
- Cyanolyca viridicyanus (D'Orbigny & Lafresnaye, 1838)

Synonyms
- Cyanolyca viridicyana

= White-collared jay =

Species of bird

The white-collared jay (Cyanolyca viridicyanus) is a species of bird in the family Corvidae, the crows and jays. It is found in Bolivia and Peru.

== Taxonomy and systematics ==
The white-collared jay was originally described in 1838 as Garrulus viridi-cyanus.

The white-collared jay has these three subspecies:

- C. v. jolyaea (Bonaparte, 1852)
- C. v. cyanolaema Hellmayr, 1917
- C. v. viridicyanus (D'Orbigny & Lafresnaye, 1838)

What are now the black-collared jay (C. armillata) and the turquoise jay (C. turcosa) were for a time treated as subspecies of the white-collared jay but they were separated beginning in the 1950s. Subspecies C. v. jolyaea was originally described as a species. Due to plumage and genetic differences from the other two subspecies it "may well [again] merit species rank".

== Description ==
The white-collared jay is 30 to 34 cm (12 to 13 in) long and weighs 82 to 127 g (2.9 to 4.5 oz). The sexes have the same plumage. Adults of the nominate subspecies C. v. viridicyanus have a black forehead, lores, and sides of the head. Their forecrown is white that extends as a thin border around the black and below the throat. Their throat and middle of the upper breast are indigo that is almost black. Most of the rest of their plumage is cerulean blue that is slightly bluer on the crown and nape. The undersides of their wings and tail are blackish. Subspecies C. v. cyanolaema is bluer than the nominate, with an ultramarine-blue throat that has more contrast with the black face. C. v. jolyaea is the bluest of the three subspecies. Its white facial border is thinner than the nominate's, its throat and upper breast are cobalt-blue, and its chin is paler still. Its wings and tail have a greenish tinge. All subspecies have a dark brown iris, a black bill, and black legs and feet.

== Distribution and habitat ==
The white-collared jay is a bird of the eastern slope of the Andes. Subspecies C. v. jolyaea is the northernmost of the three. It is found from southern Amazonas Department south to Junín and northeastern Huancavelica departments. Subspecies C. v. cyanolaema is found in southern Peru from Ayacucho Department south to Cuzco and Puno departments. The nominate subspecies is found in the northwestern Bolivian departments of La Paz and Cochabamba.

The white-collared jay inhabits humid montane forest including cloudforest and elfin forest. In Peru it ranges in elevation mostly between 2,200 and 3,500 m (7,200 and 11,500 ft) but occurs as low as 1,800 m (5,900 ft) south of the Marañón River.

== Behavior ==
=== Movement ===
The white-collared jay is a sedentary year-round resident.

=== Feeding ===
The white-collared jay's diet has not been studied. It typically forages in pairs or small flocks and mostly from the forest's mid-story to its canopy.

=== Breeding ===
Nothing is known about the white-collared jay's breeding biology.

=== Vocalization ===
What is thought to be the white-collared jay's song is "a very quiet, but remarkably varied, series of whistles, warbles, electric crackles, static, and other sounds". Its calls are "loud, electric or static sounds, popping noises, and high whistled phrases [and] a wheezy whistled series: chew chew chew".

== Status ==
The IUCN originally in 1988 assessed the white-collared jay as being of Least Concern, then in 2012 as Near Threatened, and since 2022 again as of Least Concern. It has a large range; its population size is not known but is believed to be stable. "The only potential threat known to the species is the loss of its habitat through conversion of forests for agricultural purposes. Deforestation rates are, however, currently low within the range and unlikely to negatively affect the population." One source states that the species is "[c]ommon locally, but rare or uncommon in most of its range". However, another says it is "widespread and fairly common" in Peru.
