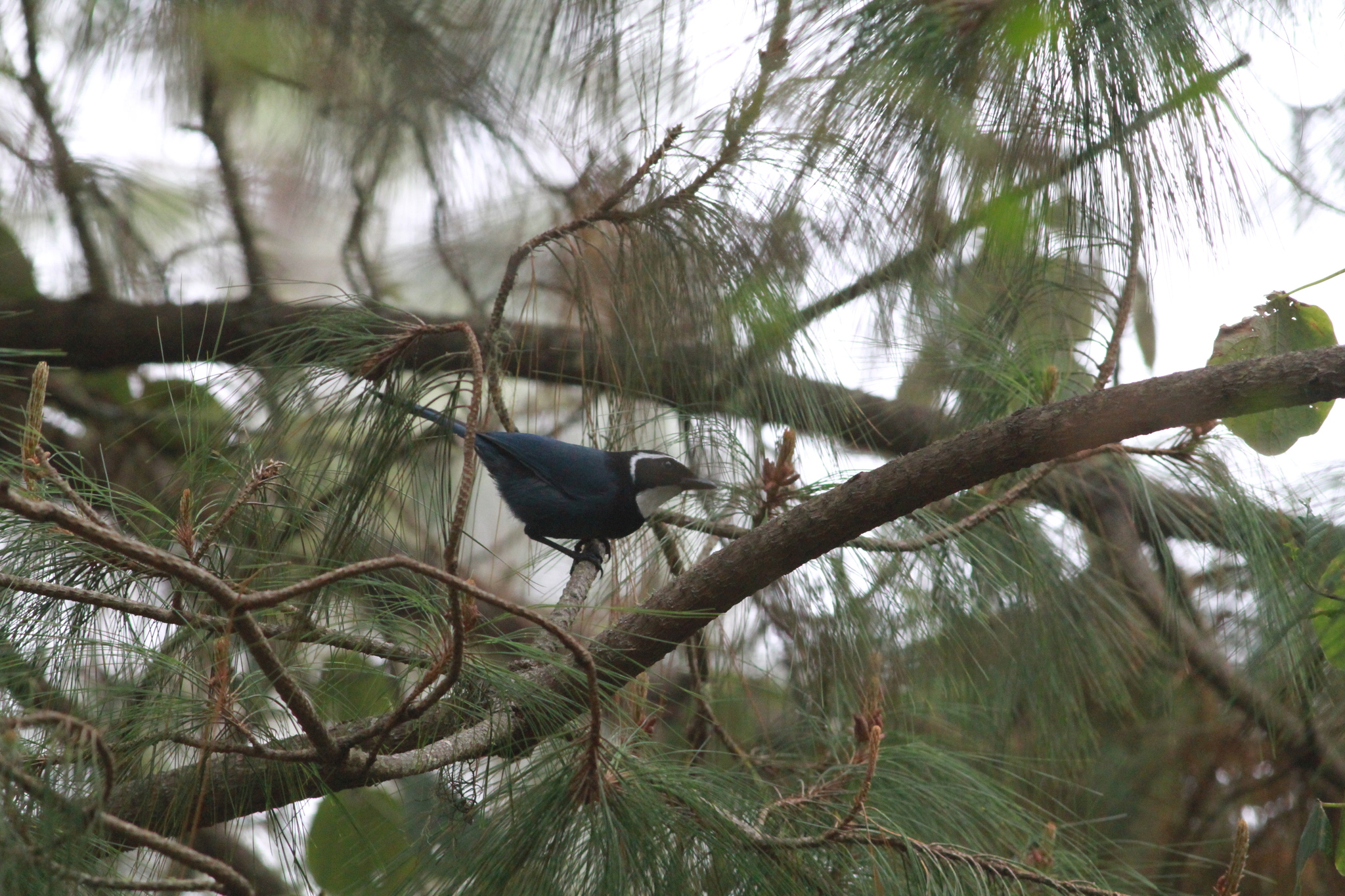

Conservation status
- Vulnerable (IUCN 3.1)

Scientific classification
- Kingdom: Animalia
- Phylum: Chordata
- Class: Aves
- Order: Passeriformes
- Family: Corvidae
- Genus: Cyanolyca
- Species: C. mirabilis

Binomial name
- Cyanolyca mirabilis Nelson, 1903

= White-throated jay =

Species of bird

The white-throated jay (Cyanolyca mirabilis), also known as the Omiltemi jay, is a Vulnerable species of bird in the family Corvidae, the crows and jays. It is endemic to Mexico.

== Taxonomy and systematics ==
The white-throated jay was originally described in 1903 as Cyanolyca mirabilis, its current binomial.

The white-throated jay is monotypic.

== Description ==
The white-throated jay is "the handsomest and most strikingly marked" member of genus Cyanolyca. It is 23 to 25 cm (9.1 to 9.8 in) long; three males weighed 50 to 54 g (1.8 to 1.9 oz). The sexes have the same plumage. Adults have a mostly black head, neck, and upper breast with a white throat and a thin white supercilium that continues around the back of the ear coverts almost to, but not joining, the white throat. The rest of their plumage is slate-blue with a greenish cast. The undersides of their wings are dark gray. They are believed to have a dark brown iris and known to have a black bill and black legs and feet. Immatures are duller overall than adults, with a greenish or bluish crown and nape and a shorter supercilium.

== Distribution and habitat ==
The white-throated jay has a disjunct distribution in southwestern Mexico. Its larger range is in the Sierra Madre del Sur and Sierra de Yucuyacua in Guerrero and northwestern Oaxaca states. A smaller range is in the Sierra de Miahuatlán in south-central Oaxaca. The species inhabits humid pine-oak forest and montane evergreen forest in the upper subtropical and temperate zones. It also occurs in coniferous forest. Overall its elevational range is about 1,800 to 3,500 m (5,900 to 11,500 ft) though in Oaxaca it is found mostly between 1,825 and 2,450 m (6,000 and 8,000 ft).

== Behavior ==
=== Movement ===
The white-throated jay is a year-round resident.

=== Feeding ===
The white-throated jay apparently forages at all levels of the forest, and often in mixed-species feeding flocks of up to about eight individuals. Its diet and details of its foraging behavior are not known.

=== Breeding ===
The white-throated jay's breeding season has not been fully defined but appears to span at least April to August. Nothing else is known about the species' breeding biology.

=== Vocalization ===
The white-throated jay's principle call is a somewhat variable "repeated, nasal perzheepup". Other descriptions are "a slightly raspy, nasal to shrill sheev-idee sheev-idee or shiev-a shiev-a, and a slightly buzzy sheir sheir".

== Status ==
The IUCN originally in 1988 assessed the white-throated jay as Threatened, then in 1994 as Endangered, and since 2000 as Vulnerable. It has a restricted and fragmented range which has apparently decreased from its historical maximum. Its estimated population of between 1500 and 7000 mature individuals is believed to be decreasing. "Many of the remaining forests within its range are under clearance for timber and large-scale agricultural expansion. Corn, fruit...and coffee cultivation is replacing lower montane forests, and logging is removing pine-oak forests". It is thought to be "not uncommon in [its] restricted range, but detailed information [is] lacking". It occurs in only one protected area.
