= Buteo burmanicus =

Buteo burmanicus may refer to two different species of bird in the genus Buteo:

- the Himalayan buzzard, Buteo refectus, which had the name Buteo burmanicus misapplied to it until later studies elucidated its relationships and renamed it B. refectus
- a subspecies of the eastern buzzard, Buteo japonicus burmanicus, the taxon which was originally described as burmanicus
