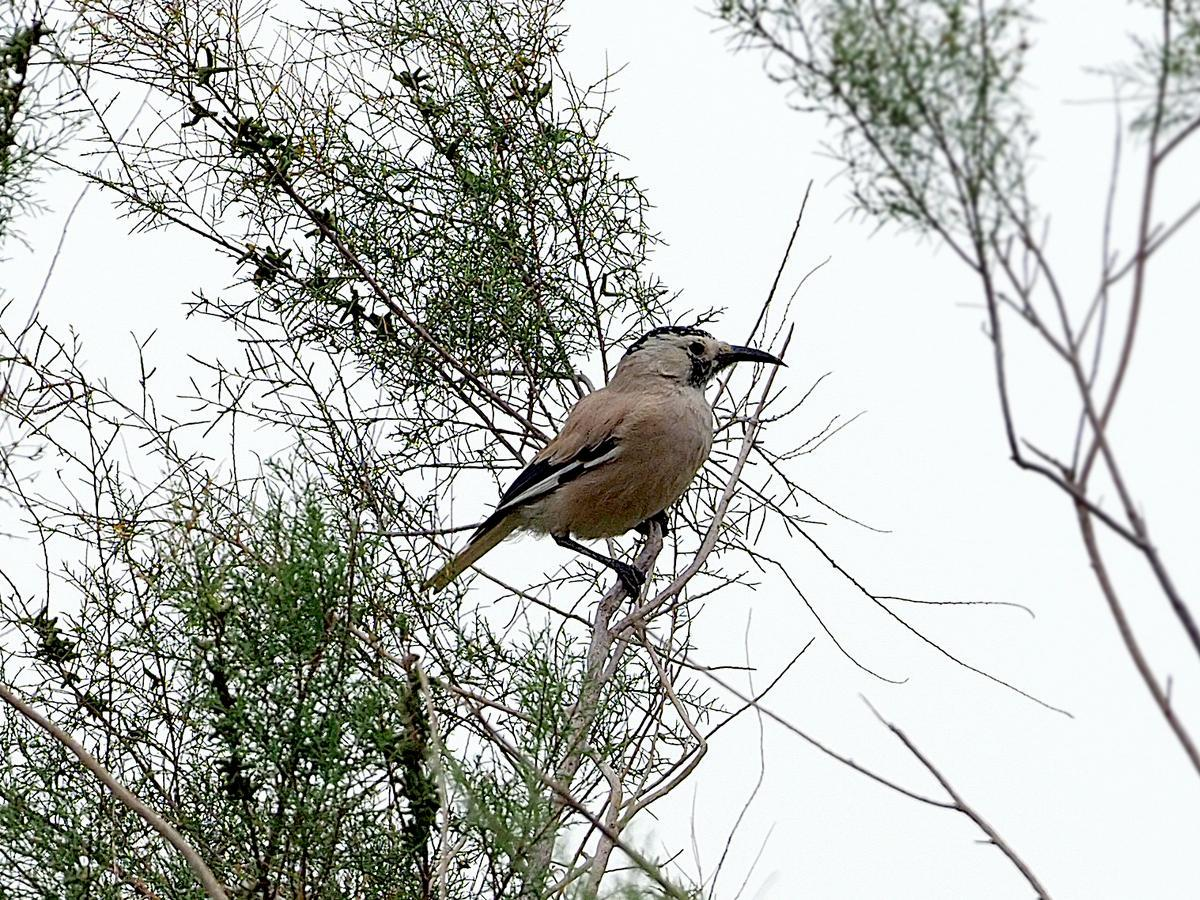

Conservation status
- Near Threatened (IUCN 3.1)

Scientific classification
- Kingdom: Animalia
- Phylum: Chordata
- Class: Aves
- Order: Passeriformes
- Family: Corvidae
- Genus: Podoces
- Species: P. biddulphi

Binomial name
- Podoces biddulphi Hume, 1874

= Xinjiang ground jay =

Species of bird

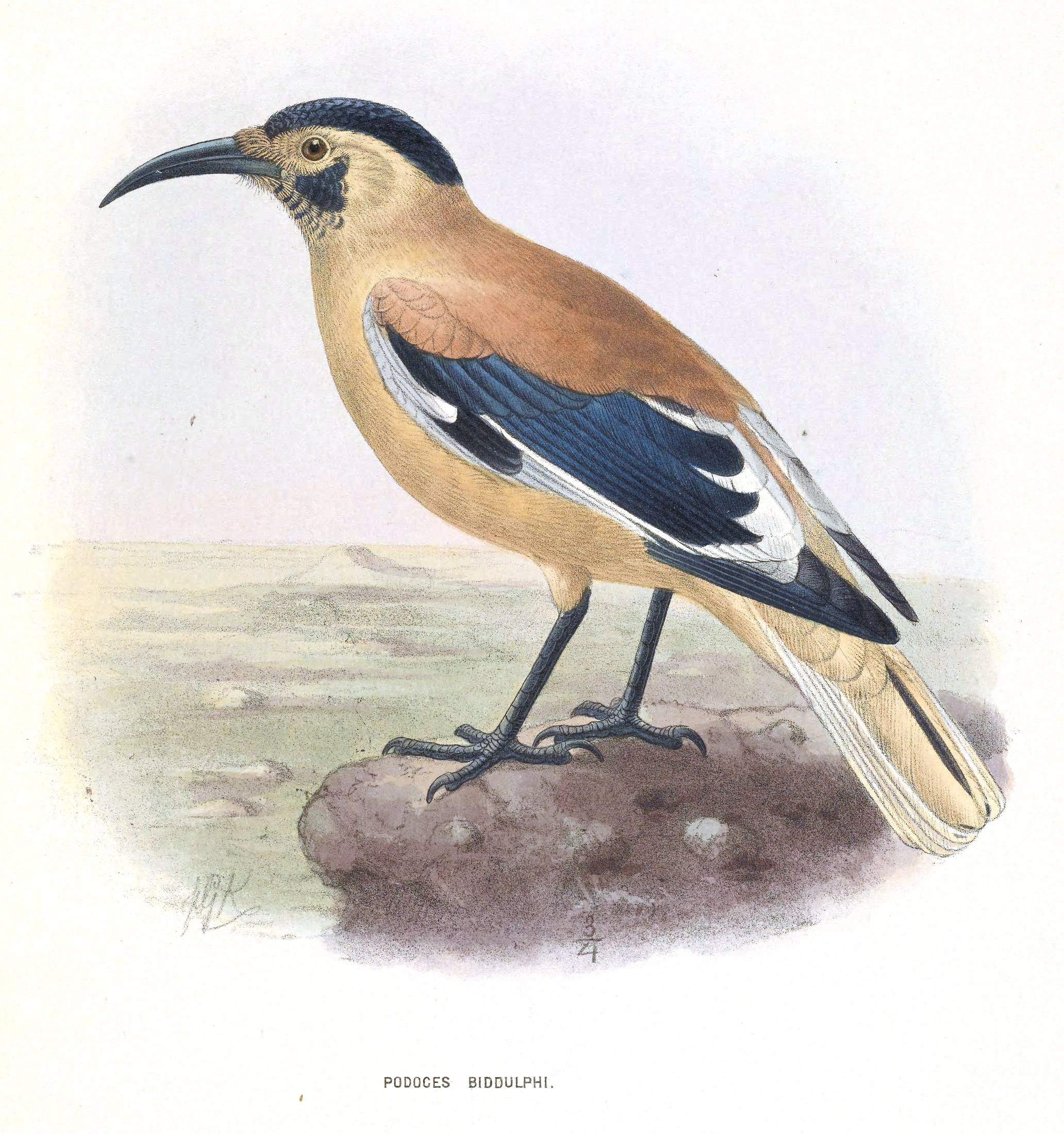
Illustration by John Gerrard Keulemans in 1891

The Xinjiang ground jay (Podoces biddulphi) or Biddulph's ground jay is a species of bird in the family Corvidae. It is endemic to Xinjiang, China. It is not larger than an adult human's hand and has a brownish white coat of feathers.

Since 2004, the International Union for Conservation of Nature (IUCN) has listed the jay's conservation status as Near Threatened due to habitat fragmentation and degradation. Its population is small, and its range is limited.

== Taxonomy ==
The xinjiang ground jay is a corvid of the subfamily Corvinae within the genus Podoces. It is related to the Iranian ground jay and the Mongolian ground jay.

== Description ==
The xinjiang ground jay is beige with partly black and white wings and a black cap. The ground jay‘s sharp beak curves downward, from underneath which a black „mustache“ turns upward to the cap. The eyes are deep brown.

== Behaviour ==
=== Feeding ===
The xinjang ground jay feeds mostly on insects, including bugs.

=== Breeding ===
The breeding season lasts from March to May. Females incubate clutches of 1–3 eggs for 18 days in open nests; they mainly incubate in the morning, and spend more time doing so if temperatures are low. When temperatures are high, they also shade the clutch. They prefer to nest toward the center of oases.

Parents share feeding duties.

Xinjiang ground jays are monogamous. They exhibit sexual dimorphism, and the males are larger than females.

They are sometimes attracted to human-influenced areas such as highways, but prefer not to nest near them.
