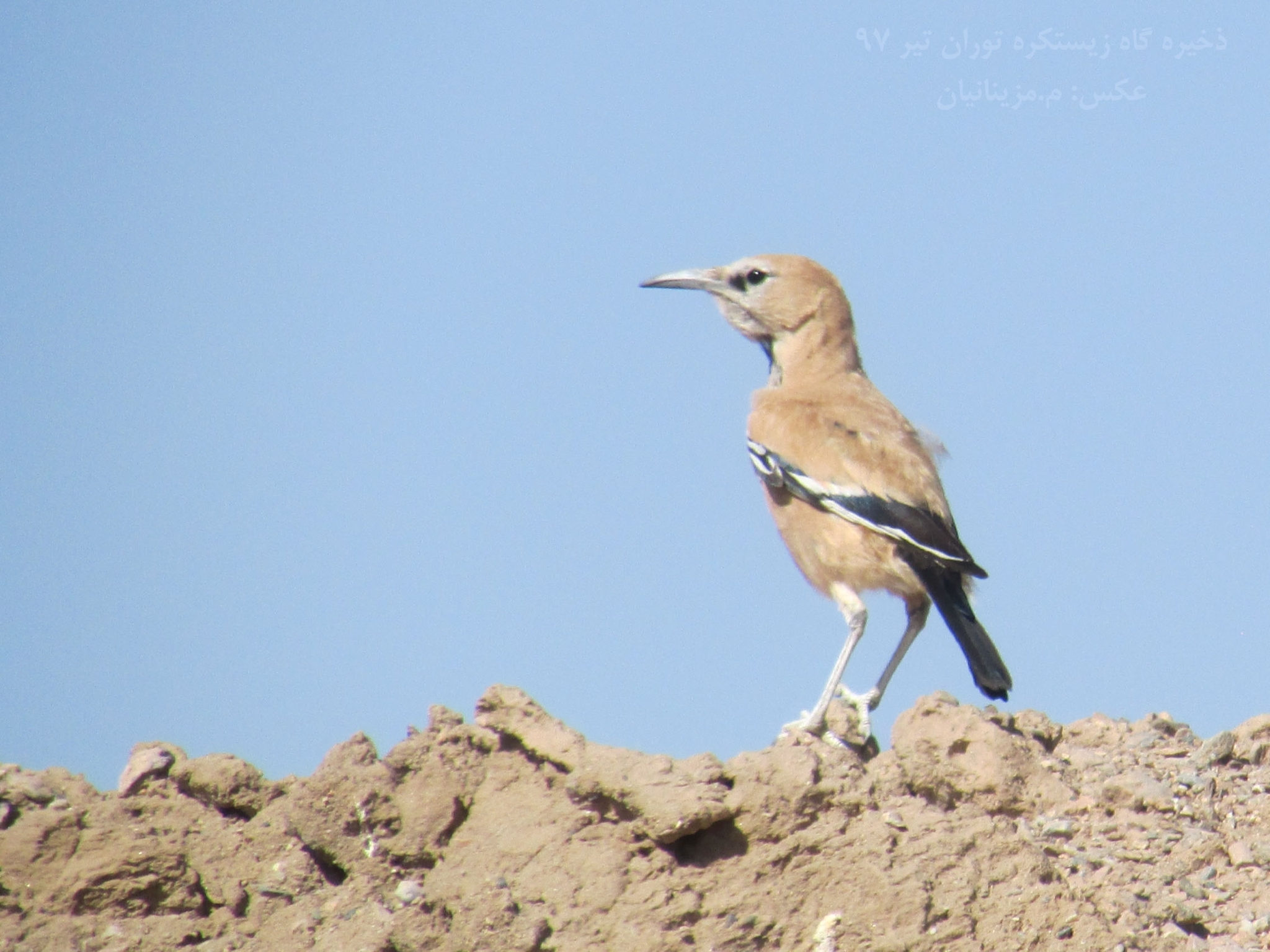

Conservation status
- Least Concern (IUCN 3.1)

Scientific classification
- Kingdom: Animalia
- Phylum: Chordata
- Class: Aves
- Order: Passeriformes
- Family: Corvidae
- Genus: Podoces
- Species: P. pleskei

Binomial name
- Podoces pleskei Zarudny, 1896

= Iranian ground jay =

Species of bird

The Iranian ground jay (Podoces pleskei) or Pleske's ground jay, is a species of bird in the family Corvidae. It is endemic to Iran where it is known as zaghbur in Persian. The species is named after Russian zoologist Theodor Pleske.

== Description ==
Around 24 cm (9.4 in) in length, with sandy beige feathers on the back, neck and upperparts, fading to off-white around the throat and breast. A black patch in the center of their throat, and black lores and tail feathers. In flight, primaries are white, with black tips, secondaries are also black with white on tips. Median coverts are striped black and white, while the remaining coverts are beige. They have a slim, decurved bill.

== Distribution and habitat ==
The Iranian ground jay is endemic to Iran, primarily inhabiting desert and semi-desert areas across the central plateau. It has been recorded in provinces including Yazd, Kerman, Semnan, Esfahan, Fars, Sistan and Baluchestan, and South Khorasan. The birds are usually found at elevations between 800 and 1900 meters above sea level. Habitat loss due to overgrazing, cutting of shrubs, and agricultural expansion as well as climate changes, are the major threats to its population.

== Behaviour ==
The bird is a terrestrial and monogamous species, adapted to arid environments. It is known for its fast running, erratic movements, and the ability to climb shrubs for foraging and nesting. Pairs maintain breeding territories, and both sexes contribute to nest defense, although the female is primarily responsible for incubation.

=== Breeding ===
Breeding typically occurs between February and early May, with nests built 30–80 cm above ground in dense shrubs such as Atraphaxis spinosa, Ephedra intermedia, and Zygophyllum eurypterum. Clutches usually contain 3–6 eggs in cooler climates, but sometimes as few as one in hotter climates, with an average incubation period of 17–19 days. The eggs are cream-colored with light brown spots, and they are about 30 mm long and 21 mm wide. The nest is typically occupied by the mother, although both parents guard the nest and defend using distraction. Chicks fledge 15–18 days after hatching. Overall survival rate, as calculated with the Mayfield method, varies from around 13% near Mehriz to 36% in the Touran Wildlife Refuge, but most chicks survive to fledging.

=== Vocalizations ===
Vocalizations are important in the species' communication and territorial displays. The Iranian ground jay produces a variety of calls, including a distinctive slow trill composed of long, high-pitched elements. Comparative vocal studies support the classification of the Iranian ground jay and its relatives in the genus Podoces, distinguishing them from the Eupodoces group, which includes the Mongolian ground jay and Xinjiang ground jay.

=== Feeding ===
Forages on the ground during the morning and evenings. Usually docile and skittish, however have been observed trying to grab food from hands. The Iranian ground jay is omnivorous, feeding on beetles, weevils, termites in the spring and summer, and in the winter and autumn, seeds and grain.

== In culture ==
In some parts of Iran, including Turan National Park, the Iranian ground jay is colloquially known as Ahmagh Davan (Persian: ااحمق دوان), meaning "the running fool," derived from their fast, erratic running movements and elusive behavior.
