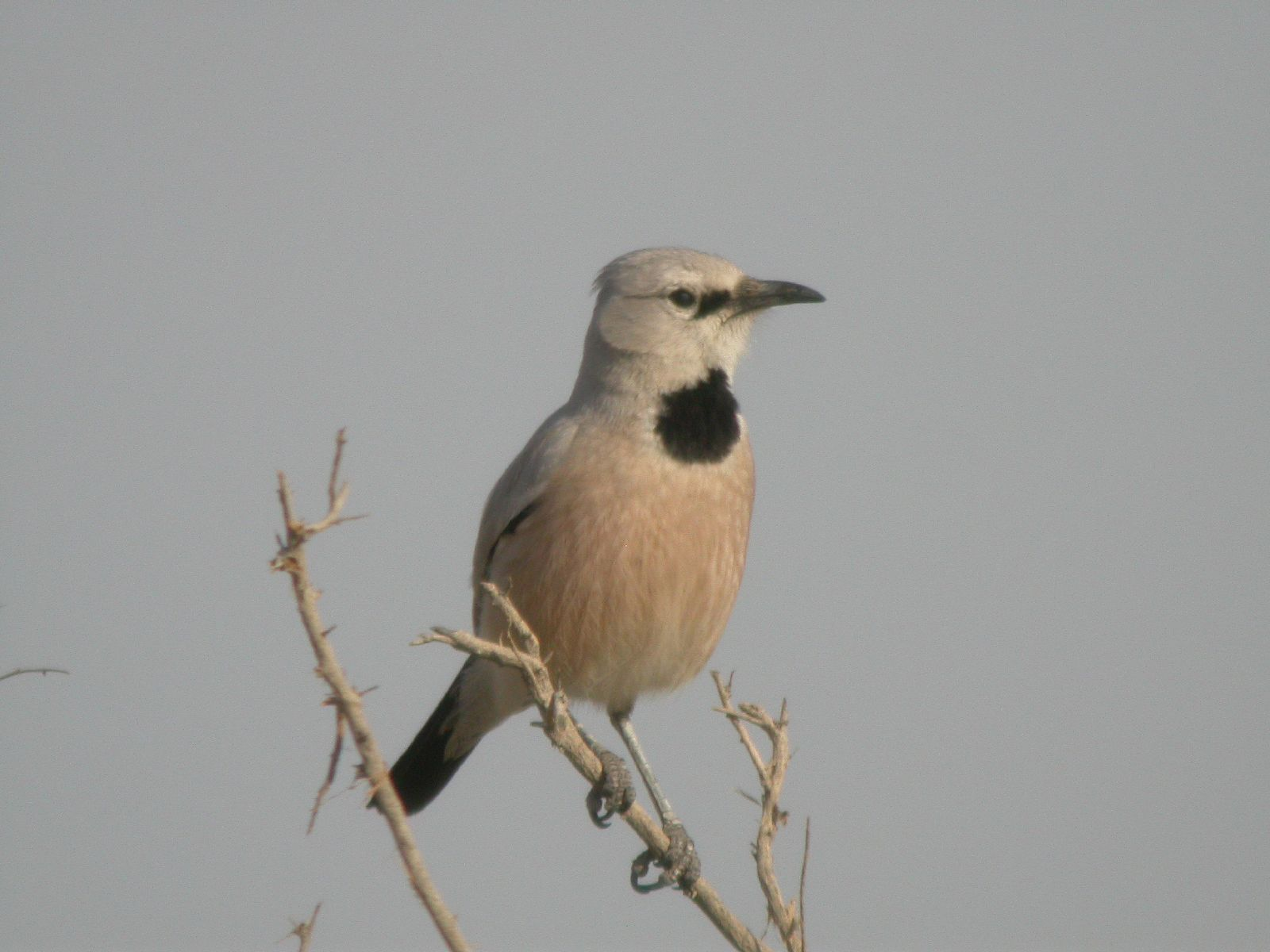

Conservation status
- Least Concern (IUCN 3.1)

Scientific classification
- Kingdom: Animalia
- Phylum: Chordata
- Class: Aves
- Order: Passeriformes
- Family: Corvidae
- Genus: Podoces
- Species: P. panderi

Binomial name
- Podoces panderi Fischer von Waldheim, 1821

= Turkestan ground jay =

Species of bird

The Turkestan ground jay, grey ground jay or Pander's ground-jay (Podoces panderi) is a species of bird in the crow and jay family, Corvidae. It is found in central Asia, particularly Kazakhstan, Turkmenistan, and Uzbekistan. More specifically, they tend to be found in Astragalus, Calligonum and southern Salsola vegetation zones. It is closely related to the Iranian ground jay. Its natural habitat is sandy desert with low shrub cover. It also forages around human settlements and roads.

== Description ==
The Turkestan ground jay is visually similar to the Iranian ground jay, except for its duller, more grayscale coat. 25 cm (9.8 in) in length, it has beige-grey upperparts, head, and neck, with a black patch on the throat. They also have a small black patch between their eyes and their black beak, which is slightly decurved.
