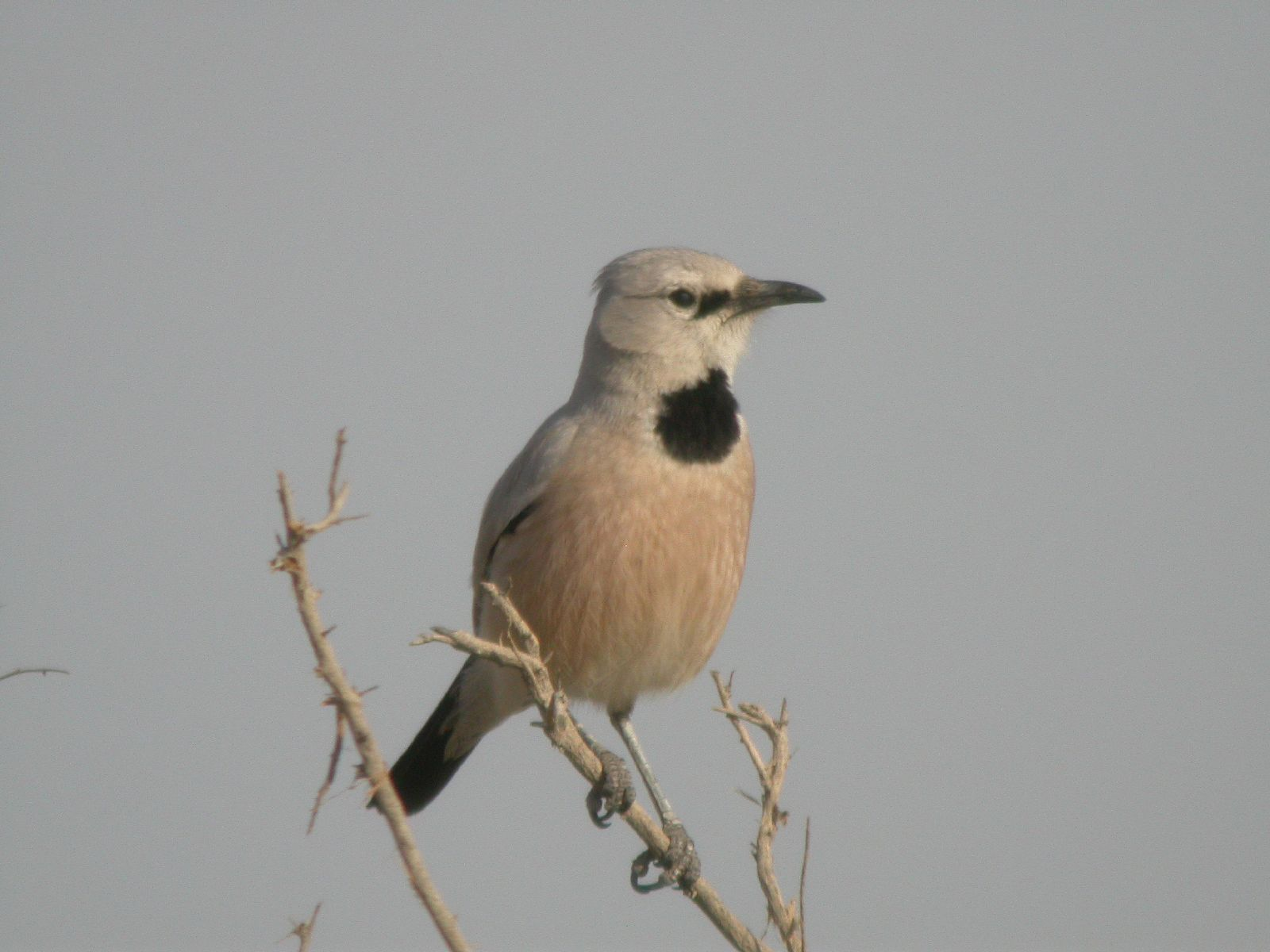
- Turkestan ground jay

Scientific classification
- Kingdom: Animalia
- Phylum: Chordata
- Class: Aves
- Order: Passeriformes
- Family: Corvidae
- Subfamily: Corvinae
- Genus: Podoces; Fischer von Waldheim, 1821

Type species
- Podoces panderi Fischer von Waldheim, 1821

Species
- Podoces hendersoni; Podoces biddulphi; Podoces pleskei; Podoces panderi

= Ground jay =

Ground jays

Genus of birds

The ground jays or ground choughs belong to a distinct group of the passerine order of birds in the genus Podoces of the crow family Corvidae. They inhabit high altitude semi-desert areas from central Asia to Mongolia.

Ground jays show adaptations to ground living such as long, strong legs adapted to fast running and the ability to leap and bound onto boulders and rocks with great agility. Their long, curved thick bills are adapted for digging and probing.

While capable of flight (which they do infrequently and relatively weakly), they prefer running, and will readily perch on trees and bushes also.

== Species list ==
| Image | Scientific name | Common name | Distribution |
|---|---|---|---|
| | Podoces hendersoni | Mongolian ground jay | Mongolia, northern China and adjacent areas of Russia and Kazakhstan |
| | Podoces biddulphi | Xinjiang ground jay | China |
| | Podoces pleskei | Iranian ground jay | Arid areas in eastern Iran |
| | Podoces panderi | Turkestan ground jay | Kazakhstan, Turkmenistan, and Uzbekistan |

The ground tit (Pseudopodoces humilis), previously Hume's ground jay, has changed its placement within the Passeriformes recently because of molecular and osteological testing. It has now been placed into the Paridae.
