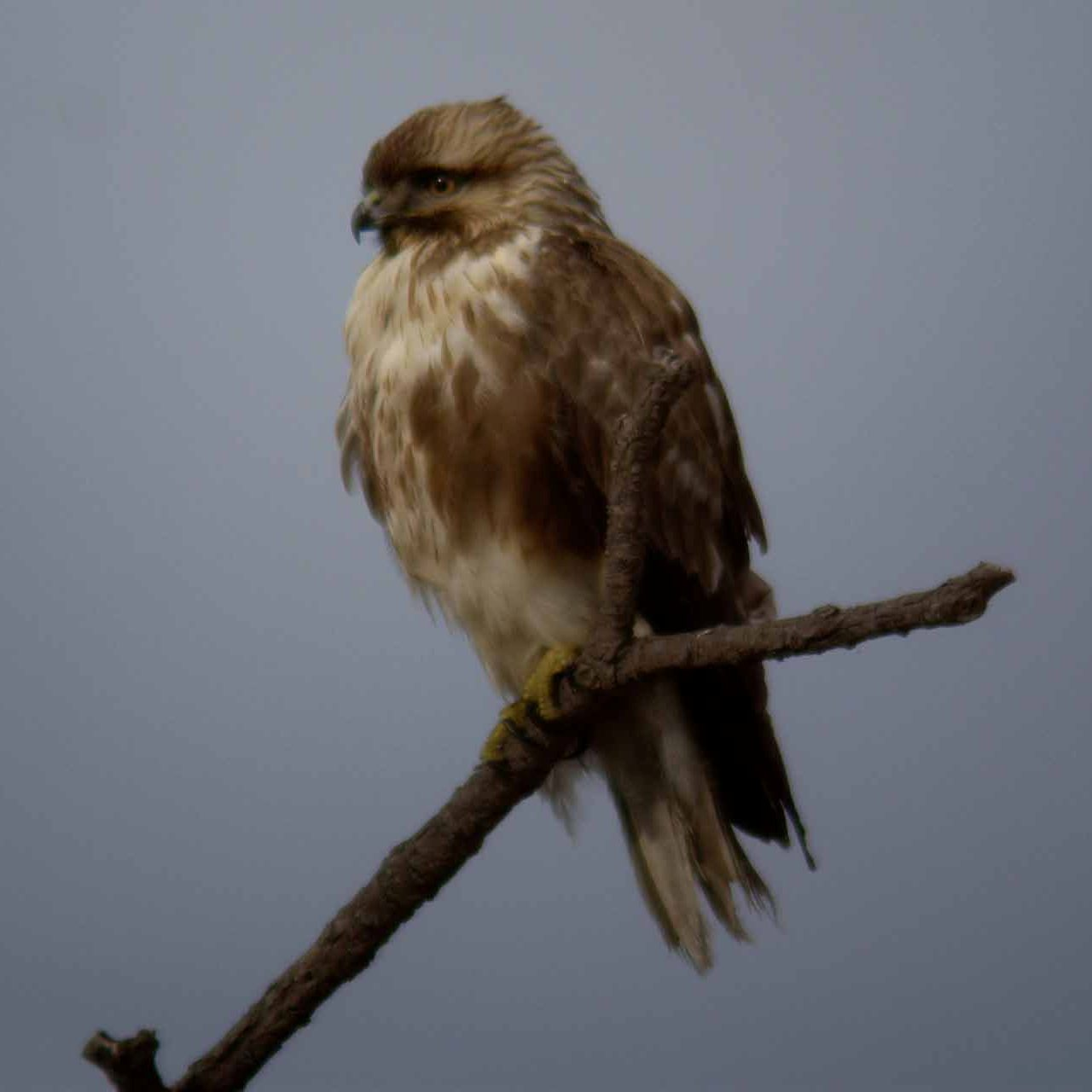

Conservation status
- Least Concern (IUCN 3.1)

Scientific classification
- Kingdom: Animalia
- Phylum: Chordata
- Class: Aves
- Order: Accipitriformes
- Family: Accipitridae
- Genus: Buteo
- Species: B. japonicus

Binomial name
- Buteo japonicus Temminck & Schlegel, 1845

Subspecies
- B. j. burmanicus - Hume, 1875; B. j. japonicus - Temminck & Schlegel, 1845; B. j. toyoshimai - Momiyama, 1927; B. j. oshiroi - Kuroda, Nagahisa, 1971

= Eastern buzzard =

Species of bird

The eastern buzzard or Japanese buzzard (Buteo japonicus) is a medium to large bird of prey that is sometimes considered a subspecies of the widespread common buzzard (Buteo buteo). It was formerly treated as a subspecies of the common buzzard, but molecular phylogenetic studies revealed that B. buteo as then circumscribed was polyphyletic, leading to the recognition of the eastern buzzard and Himalayan buzzard (B. refectus) as distinct species. It is native to East Asia and some parts of Russia and South Asia, with some birds wintering in Southeast Asia. It is similar to the steppe buzzard. It is carnivorous.

It includes four subspecies:

- B. j. burmanicus: breeds in Siberia, Mongolia, northern China, and North Korea, winters in Southeast Asia
- B. j. japonicus: breeds only in Japan, winters from southern Japan to southeastern China and Taiwan
- B. j. toyoshimai: Izu Islands and Bonin Islands
- B. j. oshiroi: Daito Islands

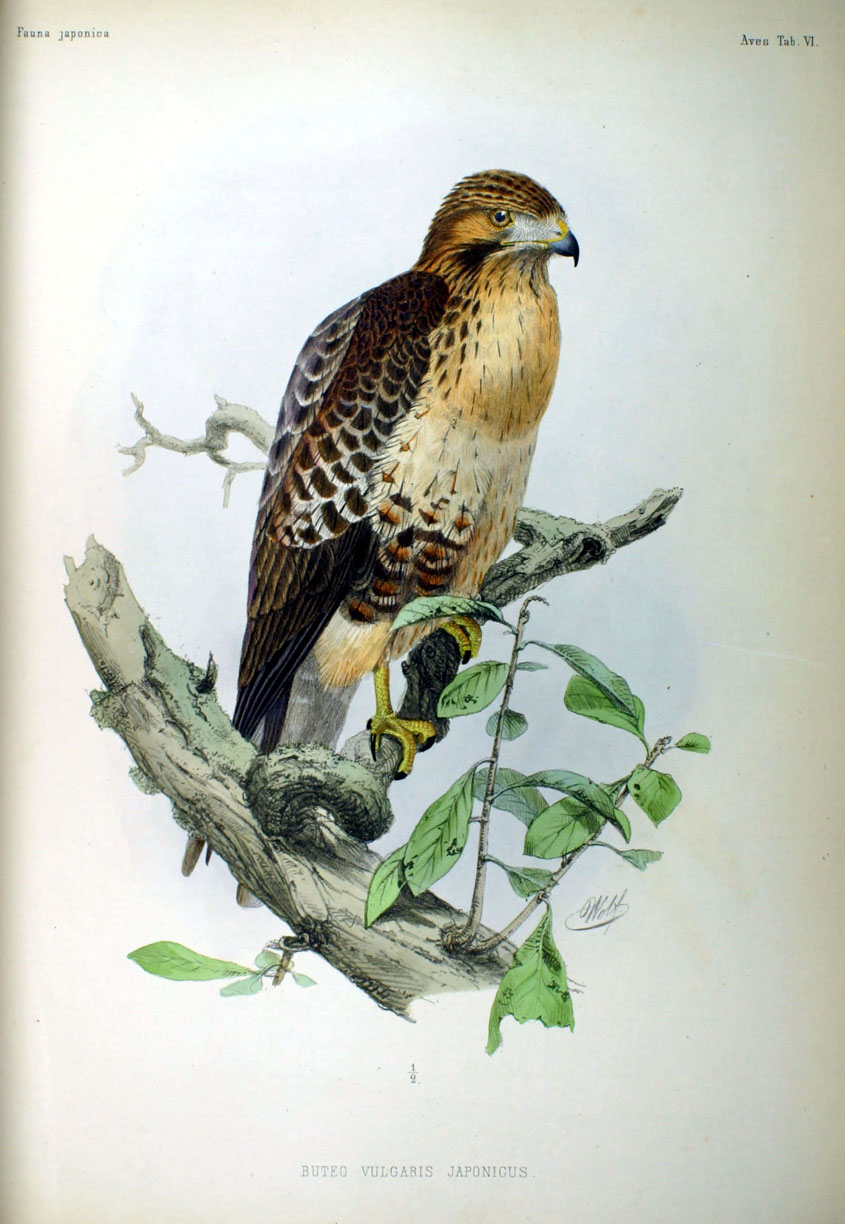
Eastern buzzard as depicted by a Japanese artist.
