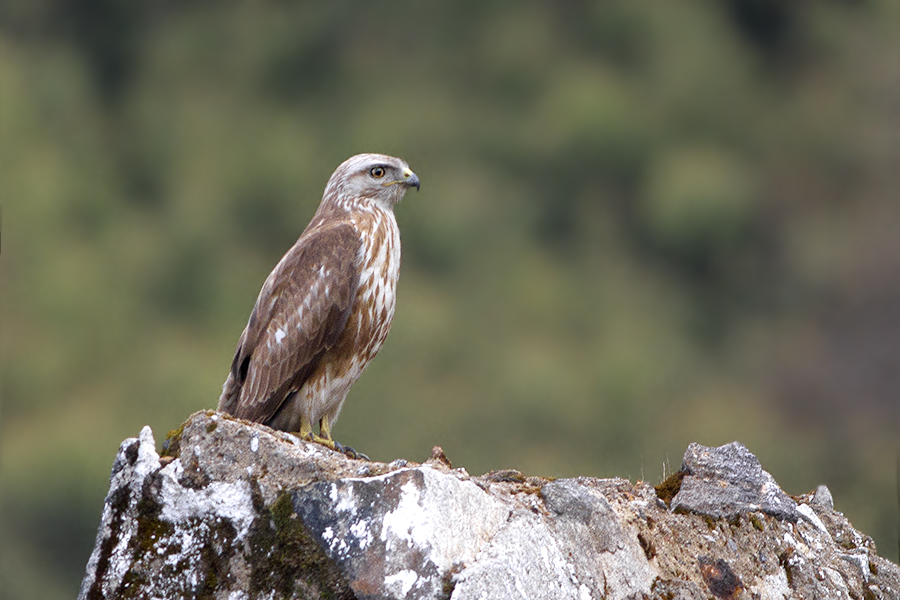
- From Pangolakha Wildlife Sanctuary, East Sikkim, India

Conservation status
- Least Concern (IUCN 3.1)

Scientific classification
- Kingdom: Animalia
- Phylum: Chordata
- Class: Aves
- Order: Accipitriformes
- Family: Accipitridae
- Genus: Buteo
- Species: B. refectus

Binomial name
- Buteo refectus Portenko, 1935

Synonyms
- Buteo burmanicus (Hume, 1875)

= Himalayan buzzard =

Species of bird

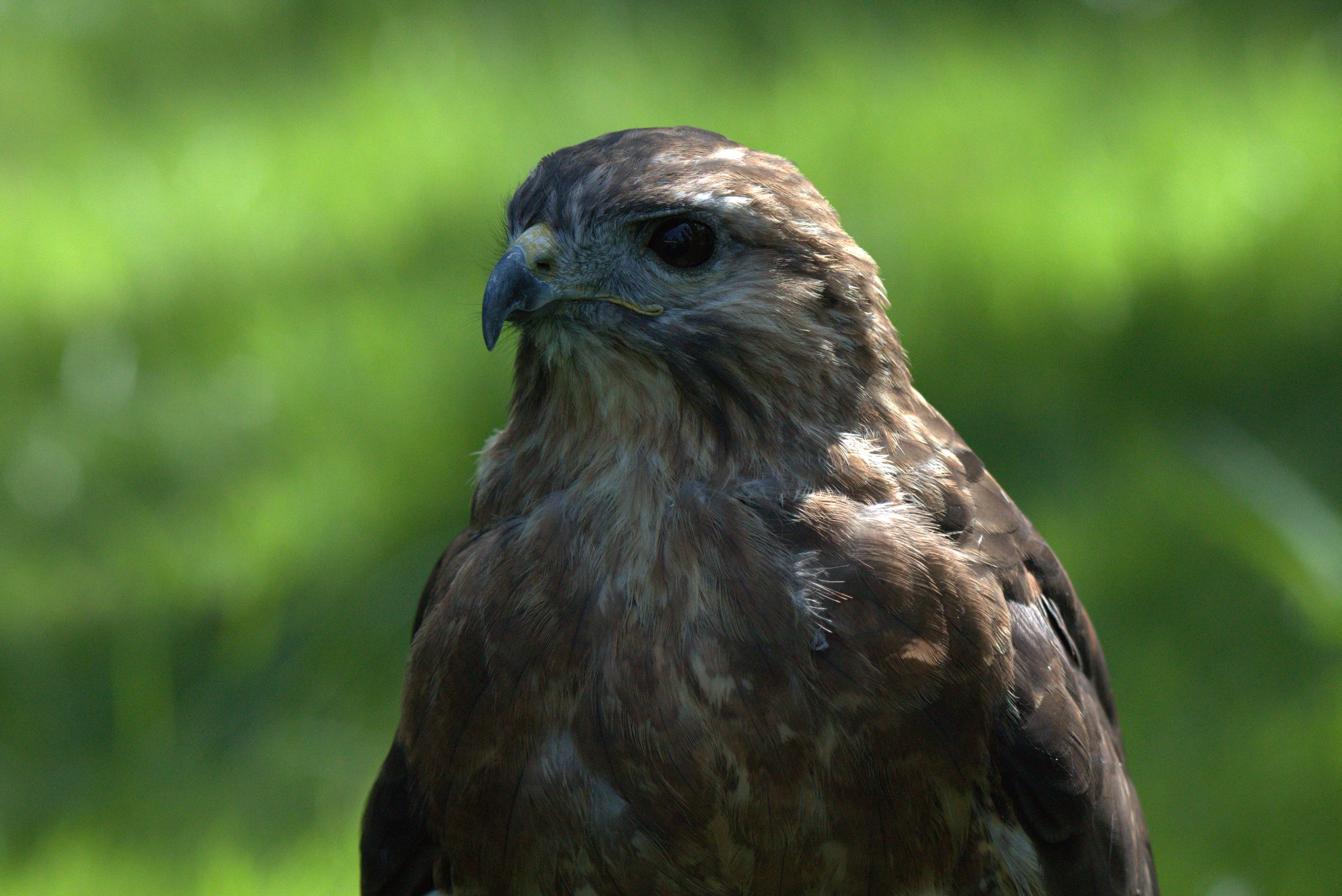
Buteo refectus (Dali Falconer Education and Raptor Conservation Centre)

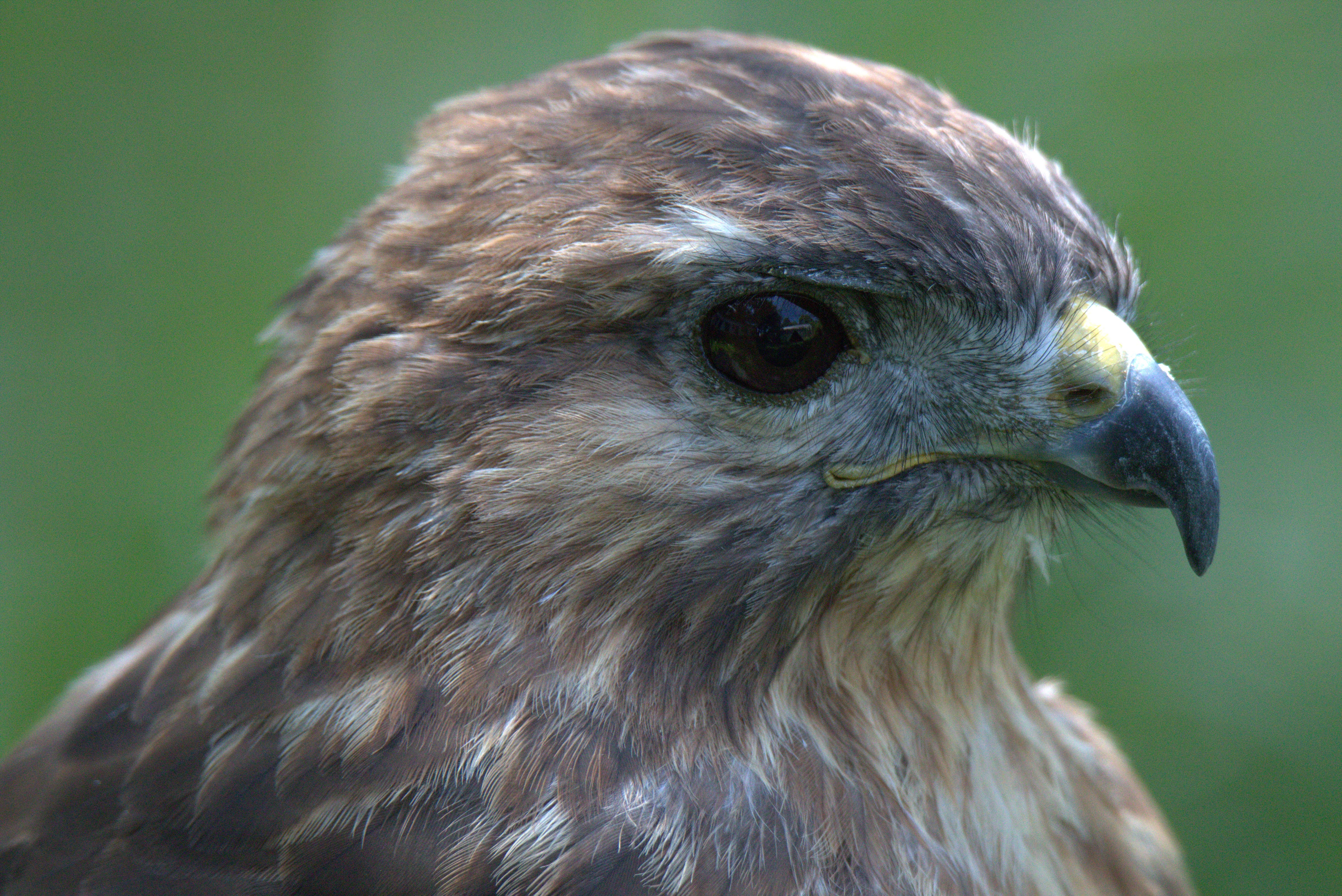
Buteo refectus (Dali Falconer Education and Raptor Conservation Centre)

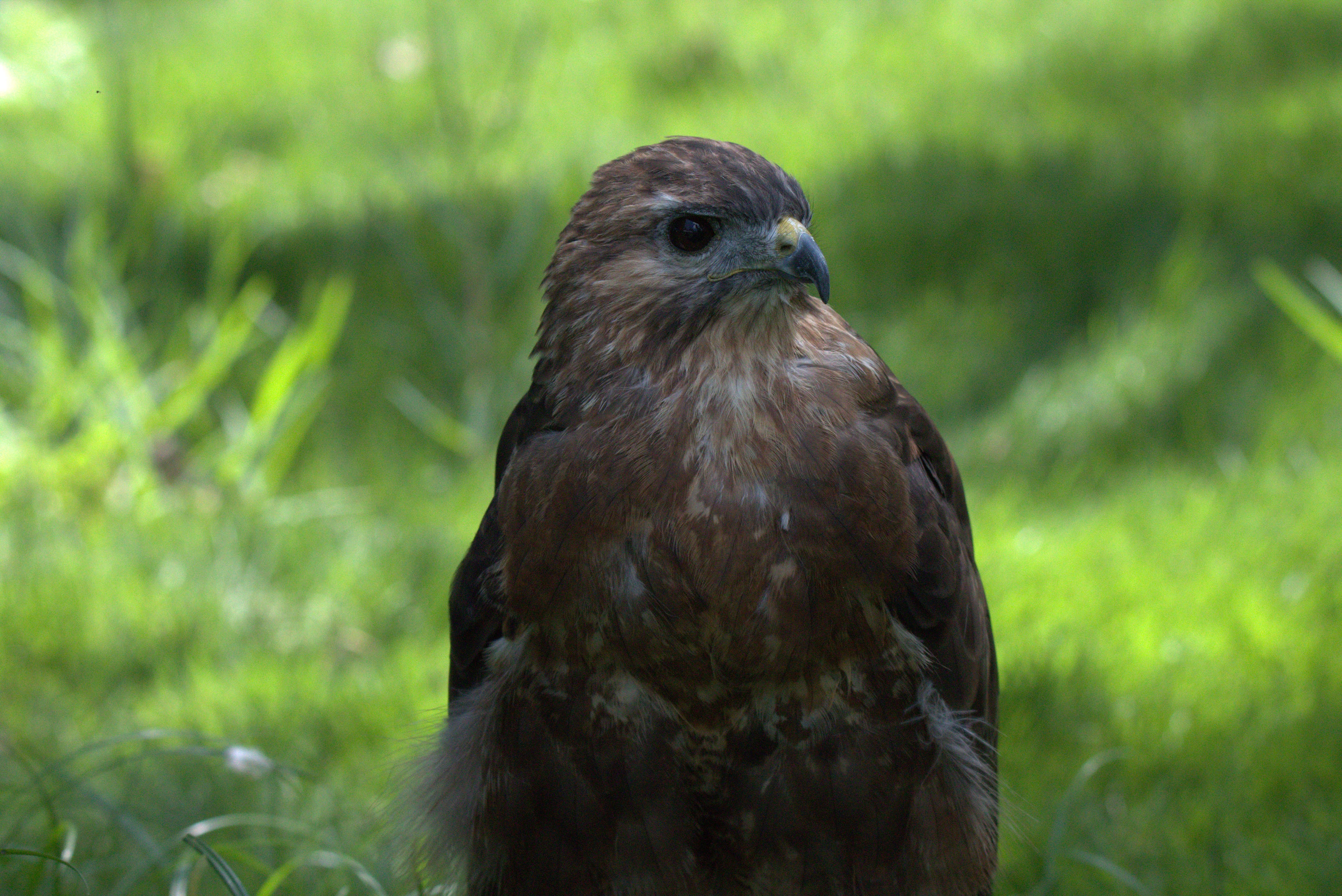
Buteo refectus (Dali Falconer Education and Raptor Conservation Centre)

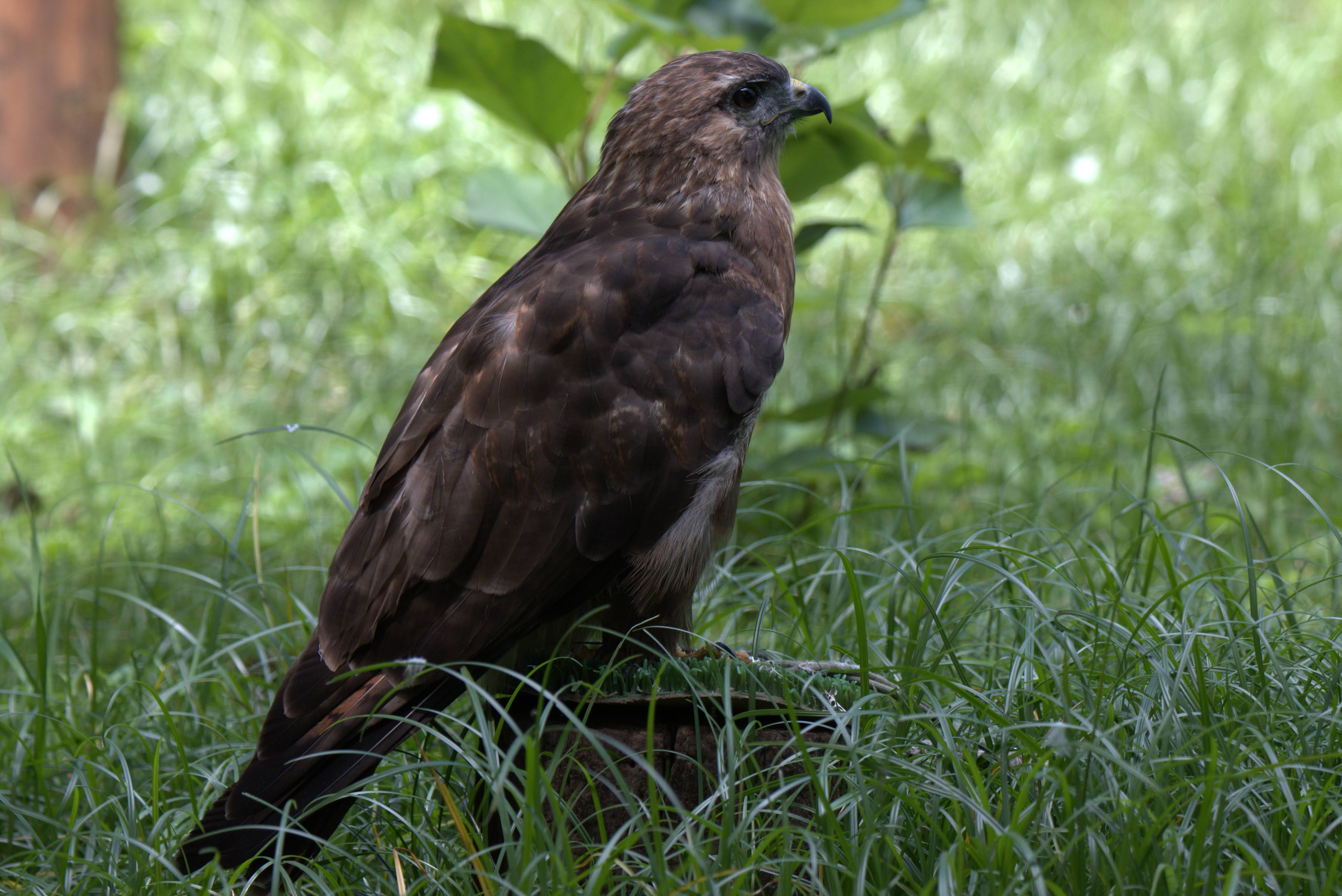
Buteo refectus (Dali Falconer Education and Raptor Conservation Centre)

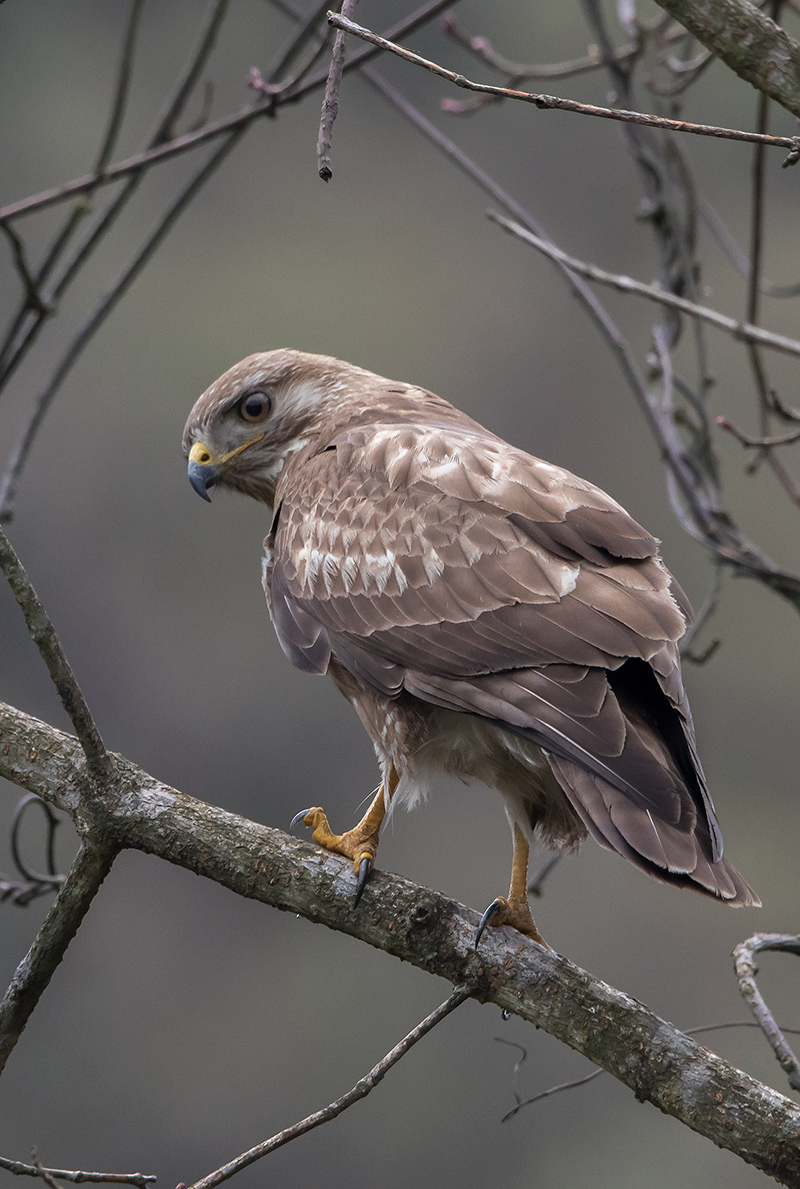
At Pangolakha Wildlife Sanctuary

The Himalayan buzzard (Buteo refectus) is a medium to large bird of prey that was formerly considered a subspecies of the widespread common buzzard (Buteo buteo). It is native to the Himalayas in Nepal, India and adjacent mountains of southern China.

It was formerly given the scientific name Buteo burmanicus, but this name is now known to have been previously applied to the migratory mainland Asian subspecies of the eastern buzzard (B. japonicus burmanicus), and the Himalayan buzzard was thus renamed Buteo refectus.
