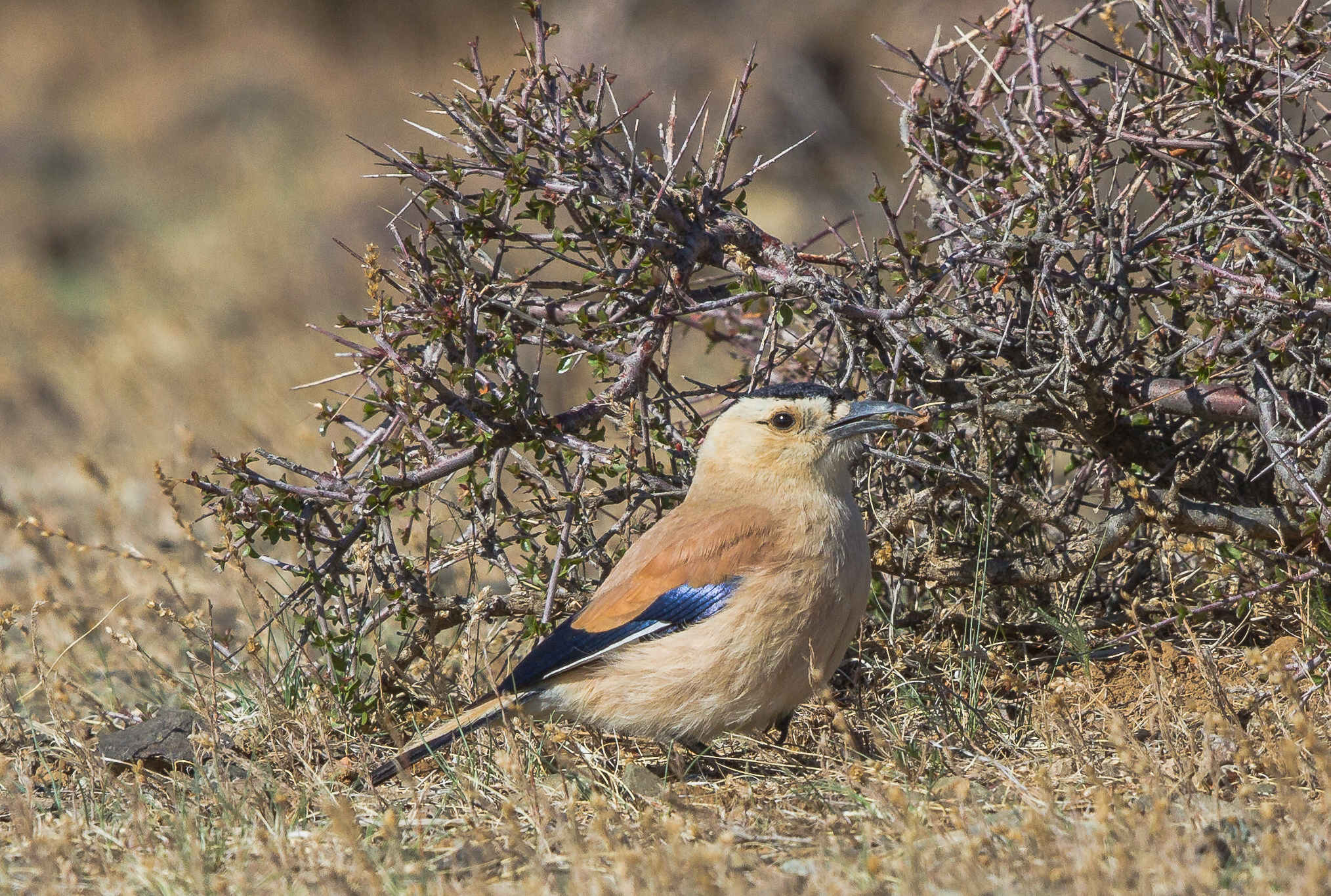

Conservation status
- Least Concern (IUCN 3.1)

Scientific classification
- Kingdom: Animalia
- Phylum: Chordata
- Class: Aves
- Order: Passeriformes
- Family: Corvidae
- Genus: Podoces
- Species: P. hendersoni

Binomial name
- Podoces hendersoni Hume, 1871

= Mongolian ground jay =

Species of bird

The Mongolian ground jay (Podoces hendersoni) or Henderson's ground jay is a species of bird in the family Corvidae, found in Central Asia.

== Description ==
The bird is 28 cm (11 in) in length, with sandy-beige upperparts, off-white breast, and iridescent dark blue on the secondary feathers, and on the tips of the primary feathers. It has a long, decurved beak and a black stripe on its forehead.

== Distribution ==
It is found in arid areas of Central Asia (Mongolia, northern China and adjacent areas of Russia and Kazakhstan). It is threatened by habitat loss and fragmentation. It tends to live on areas with gravel surfaces.

== Behaviour ==
Eggs are typically laid and hatched in April-May. They nest in Prunus pedunculata. Females spend more time foraging and the males spend more time brooding the chicks at the start of the nesting period.

They are most active in the morning.

Among ground jays, they have a relatively short trill call.

== Diet ==
The main diet of the nestling Mongolian ground jay consists of common lizards, toad-headed agama, and invertebrates. It is proposed that Mongolian ground jays feed their chicks based on the availability of their food rather than in relation to the stage of the chicks development. They spend more time foraging at warmer temperatures.
