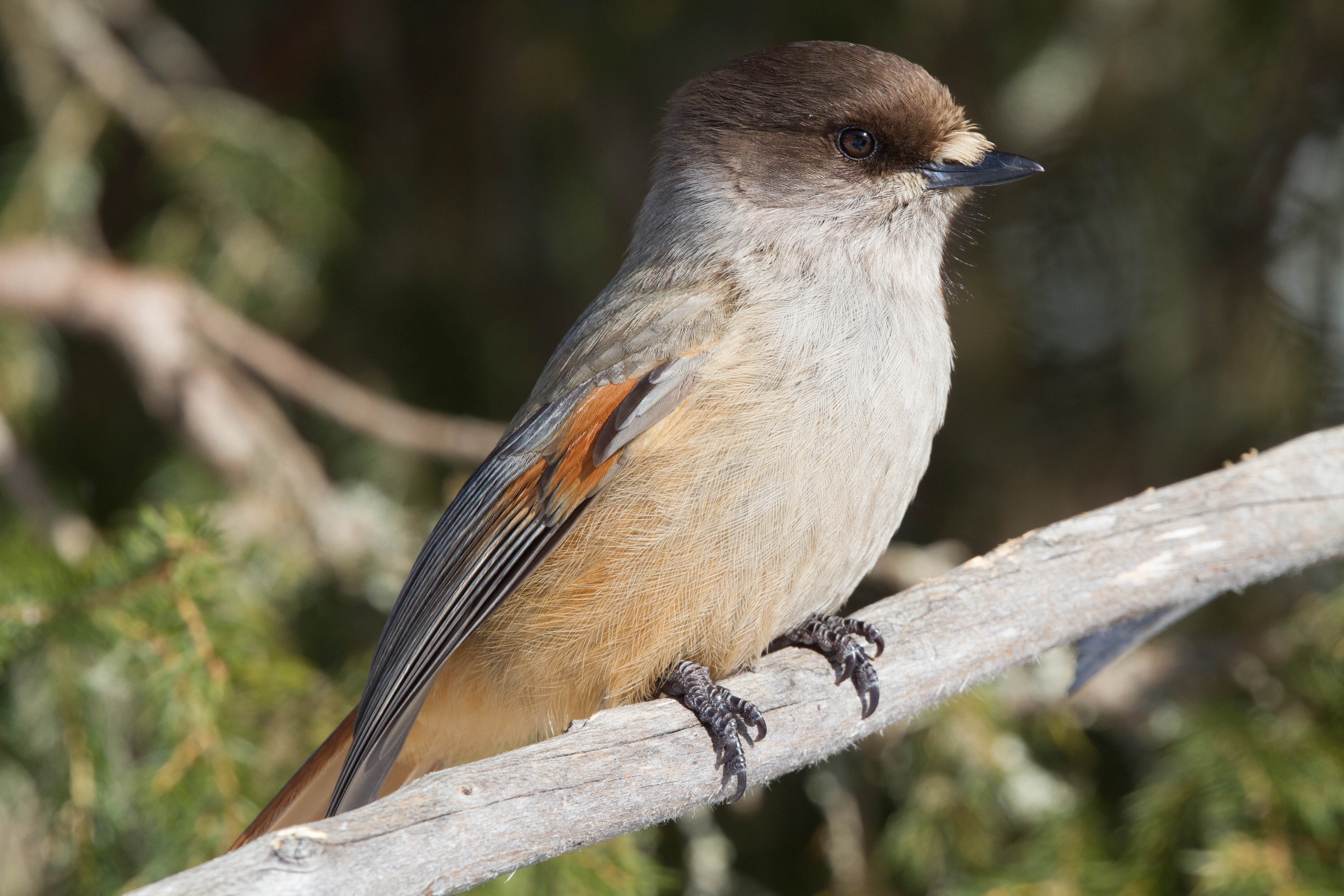
- Siberian jay (Perisoreus infaustus)

Scientific classification
- Kingdom: Animalia
- Phylum: Chordata
- Class: Aves
- Order: Passeriformes
- Family: Corvidae
- Subfamily: Perisoreinae; Bonaparte, 1853

Genera
- Perisoreus Bonaparte, 1831; Cyanopica Bonaparte, 1850

= Perisoreinae =

Subfamily of birds

Perisoreinae is a subfamily of passerine birds in the family Corvidae (crows and jays). The subfamily comprises five species: the Holarctic jays, including the boreal forest jays of the genus Perisoreus and the magpies of the genus Cyanopica. Members of Perisoreinae are distributed across northern Eurasia and North America, as well as arid regions of Central Asia.

== Taxonomy ==
The subfamily Perisoreinae was established by Charles Lucien Bonaparte in 1853. Historically, the genera now placed in Perisoreinae were variably classified within the broad assemblage of jays (traditionally Garrulinae). Subsequent multilocus and genomic analyses have consistently supported the monophyly of Perisoreinae and its basal position relative to other corvid lineages.

== Distribution and habitat ==
Perisoreinae exhibits a disjunct distribution across the Northern Hemisphere. Perisoreus species inhabit boreal and montane coniferous forests of North America and northern Eurasia, while Cyanopica occurs in temperate woodlands of East Asia and the Iberian Peninsula. The Iberian and East Asian populations of Cyanopica are now widely treated as distinct species.

== Behavior and ecology ==
Members of Perisoreinae are socially complex birds. Cyanopica species are notably gregarious, forming cooperative breeding groups, while Perisoreus species often live in stable family units. The Siberian jay is particularly well studied for kin-based social behavior and predator avoidance strategies. Cooperative behaviors, including predator mobbing and food sharing, have been documented in some species, particularly the Siberian jay.

== Evolutionary history ==
Fossil-calibrated phylogenies suggest that Perisoreinae diverged from other corvid lineages during the Miocene, with subsequent specialization into forest and desert niches. The ecological divergence between arboreal and terrestrial forms is considered one of the most pronounced within Corvidae.

- Corvidae
  - - Pyrrhocoracinae
      Pyrrhocorax
  - - - Crypsirininae
        - Dendrocitta
        - - Crypsirina
          - - Temnurus
            - Platysmurus
    - - - Cissinae
          - Urocissa
          - Cissa
      - - - Perisoreinae
            - Perisoreus
            - Cyanopica
        - - Cyanocoracinae
            - - - Cyanocorax
                - - Calocitta
                  - Psilorhinus
              - - Aphelocoma
                - - Cyanocitta
                  - Gymnorhinus
            - Cyanolyca
          - Corvinae
            - - Corvus sensu lato
                - Corvus
                - Coloeus
              - Nucifraga
            - - - Pica
                - Garrulus
              - - - Podoces
                  - Ptilostomus
                - Zavattariornis
- Laniidae
