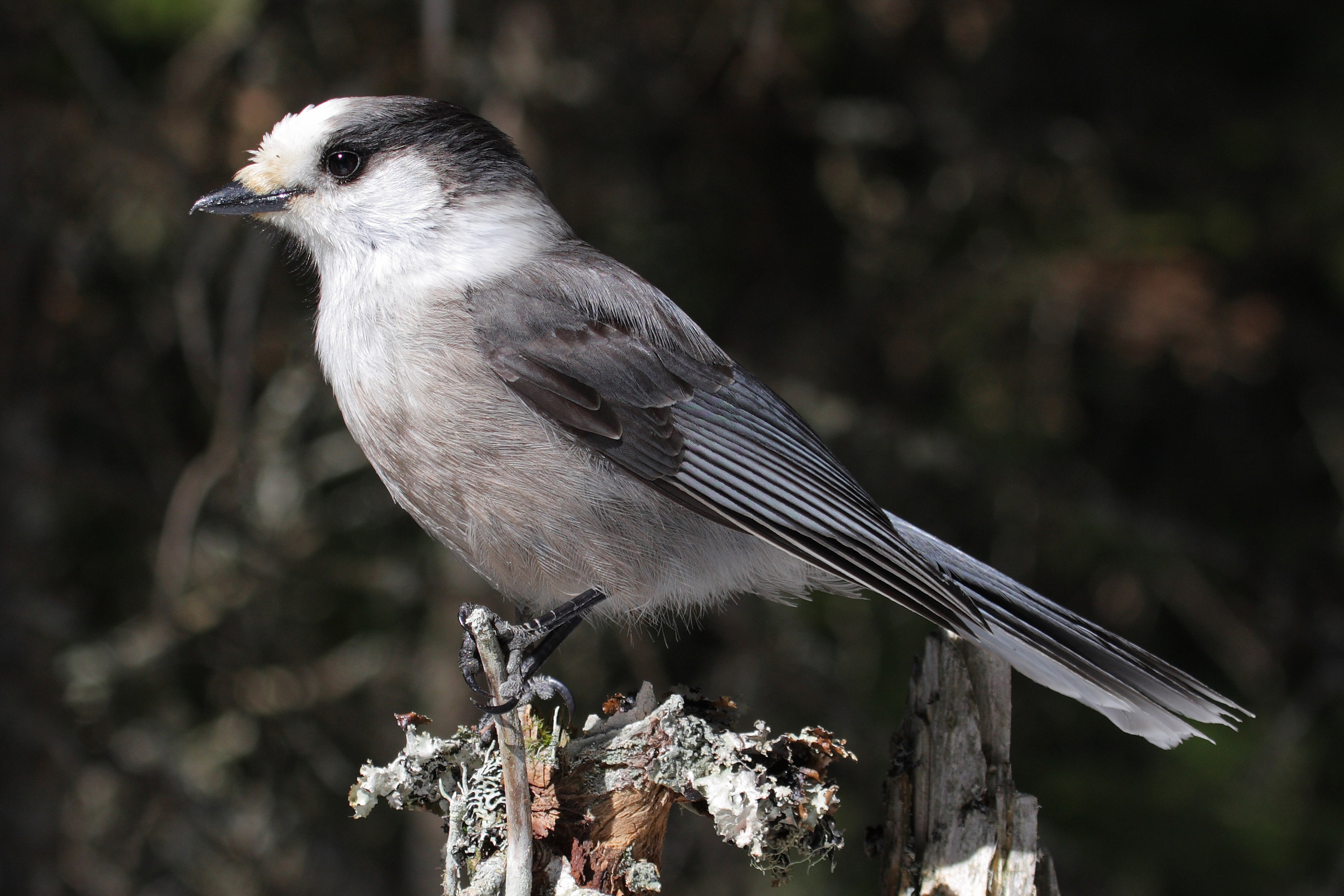
- In Laurentides Wildlife Reserve, Quebec

Conservation status
- Least Concern (IUCN 3.1)

Scientific classification
- Kingdom: Animalia
- Phylum: Chordata
- Class: Aves
- Order: Passeriformes
- Family: Corvidae
- Genus: Perisoreus
- Species: P. canadensis

Binomial name
- Perisoreus canadensis (Linnaeus, 1766)

Subspecies
- 9 subspecies; see text
- Canada jay range (note: map lacks distribution in New York state)

Synonyms
- Corvus canadensis Linnaeus, 1766; Dysornithia brachyrhyncha Swainson, 1831

= Canada jay =

Passerine bird of the family Corvidae

The Canada jay (Perisoreus canadensis), also known as the grey jay, gray jay, camp robber, moose bird, gorby, or whisky jack, is a passerine bird of the family Corvidae. It is found in boreal forests of North America, north to the tree line, and in the Rocky Mountains subalpine zone south to New Mexico and Arizona. A fairly large songbird, the Canada jay has pale grey underparts, darker grey upperparts, and a grey-white head with a darker grey nape. It is one of three members of the genus Perisoreus, a genus more closely related to the magpie genus Cyanopica than to other birds known as jays. The Canada jay itself has nine recognized subspecies.

Canada jays live year-round on permanent territories in coniferous forests, surviving in winter months on food cached throughout their territory in warmer periods. The birds form monogamous mating pairs, with pairs accompanied on their territories by a third juvenile from the previous season. Canada jays adapt to human activity in their territories and are known to approach humans for food, inspiring a list of colloquial names including "lumberjack", "camp robber", and "venison-hawk". The International Union for Conservation of Nature (IUCN) considers the Canada jay a least-concern species, but populations in southern ranges may be affected adversely by global warming.

The species is associated with mythological figures of several First Nations cultures, including Wisakedjak, a benevolent figure whose name was anglicized to Whiskyjack. In 2016, an online poll and expert panel conducted by Canadian Geographic magazine selected the Canada jay as the national bird of Canada, although the designation is not formally recognized.

== Taxonomy ==
In 1760 the French zoologist Mathurin Jacques Brisson included a description of the Canada jay in his Ornithologie based on a specimen collected in Canada. He used the French name Le geay brun de Canada and the Latin Garralus canadensis fuscus. Although Brisson coined Latin names, these do not conform to the binomial system and are not recognized by the International Commission on Zoological Nomenclature. When in 1766 the Swedish naturalist Carl Linnaeus updated his Systema Naturae for the twelfth edition, he added 240 species that had been previously described by Brisson. One of these was the Canada jay. Linnaeus included a brief description, coined the binomial name Corvus canadensis and cited Brisson's work.

William Swainson named it Dysornithia brachyrhyncha in 1831. French ornithologist Charles Lucien Bonaparte assigned the Canada jay to the genus Perisoreus in 1838 in A geographical and comparative list of the birds of Europe and North America, along with the Siberian jay, P. infaustus. The Canada jay belongs to the crow and jay family Corvidae. However, it and the other members of its genus are not closely related to other birds known as jays; they are instead close to the genus Cyanopica, which contains the azure-winged magpie. Its relatives are native to Eurasia, and ancestors of the Canada jay are thought to have diverged from their Old World relatives and crossed Beringia into North America.

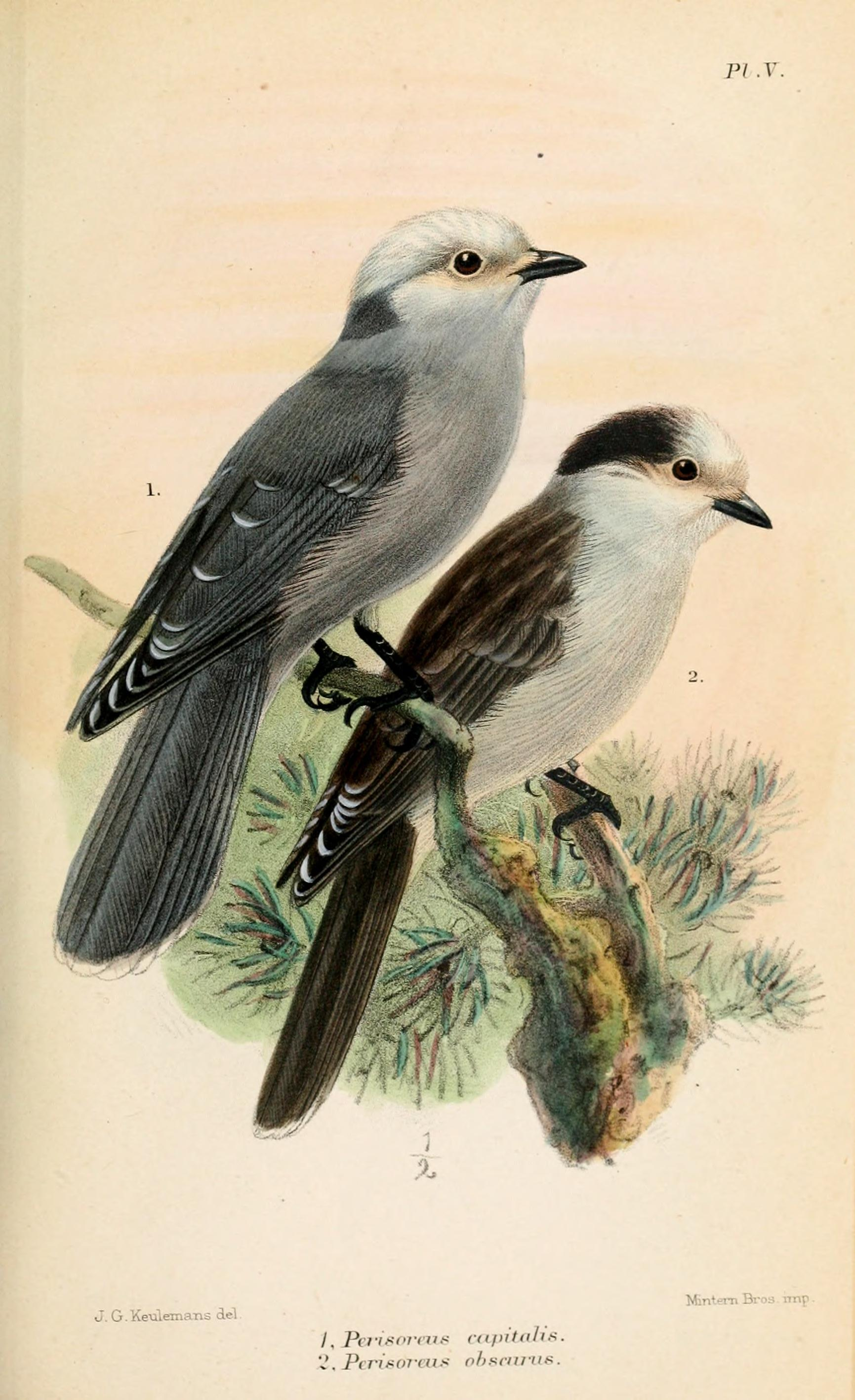
Subspecies P. c. capitalis (left) and P. c. obscurus (right); illustration by Keulemans, 1877

A 2012 genetic study revealed four clades across its range: a widespread "boreal" or "taiga" clade ranging from Alaska to Newfoundland and ranging south to the Black Hills of South Dakota, Wyoming and Utah in the west and New England in the east, a "transcascade" clade in eastern Washington and Oregon and ranging into Alberta and Montana, a "Rocky Mountains (Colorado)" clade from the southern Rocky Mountains, and a "Pacific" clade from coastal British Columbia, Washington, and southwestern Oregon. There was also a population of the boreal clade in the central Rocky Mountains between the Colorado and transcascade clades. Genetic dating suggests the Pacific clade diverged from the common ancestor of the other clades around three million years ago in the Late Pliocene.

The boreal clade is genetically diverse, suggesting that Canada jays retreated to multiple areas of milder climate during previous ice ages and recolonized the region in warmer times.

In 2018 the common name was changed from grey jay to Canada jay by the American Ornithological Society in a supplement to their Check-list of North American Birds. This change was also made in the online list of world birds maintained on behalf of the International Ornithologists' Union by Frank Gill and David Donsker.

Nine subspecies are recognized:

- Perisoreus canadensis albescens, also known as the Alberta jay, was described by American ornithologist James L. Peters in 1920. It ranges from northeastern British Columbia and northwestern Alberta southeastward, east of the Rocky Mountains to the Black Hills of South Dakota. It is an occasional visitor to northwestern Nebraska.
- P. c. bicolor, described by American zoologist Alden H. Miller in 1933, is found in southeastern British Columbia, southwestern Alberta, eastern Washington, northeastern Oregon, northern and central Idaho, and western Montana. Miller noted that the subspecies appeared to be a stable intermediate form between canadensis and capitalis. It was a similar size to subspecies canadensis, and had a wholly white head with a black nape. Its body markings resembled those of capitalis but its colouration resembled canadensis.
- P. c. canadensis, the nominate subspecies, breeds from northern British Columbia east to Prince Edward Island, and south to the northern reaches of Minnesota, Wisconsin, Michigan, Vermont, and New Hampshire, as well as northeastern New York and Maine. It winters at lower altitudes within the breeding range and south to southern Ontario and Massachusetts, and is an occasional visitor to central Minnesota, southeastern Wisconsin, northwestern Pennsylvania, and central New York. P. c. canadensis is also a vagrant to northeastern Pennsylvania (Philadelphia).
- P. c. capitalis is found in the southern Rocky Mountains from eastern Idaho, south-central Montana, and western and southern Wyoming south through eastern Utah, and western and central Colorado, to east-central Arizona and north-central New Mexico. American naturalist Spencer Fullerton Baird described this subspecies in 1873. It has a wholly whitish head with a pale band on the back of the neck, and overall more ashy grey plumage. It is also generally larger than the nominate subspecies canadensis.
- P. c. griseus occurs from southwestern British Columbia and Vancouver Island south through central Washington and central Oregon to the mountains of north-central and northeastern California. It was described by Robert Ridgway in 1899.
- P. c. nigricapillus, also known as the Labrador jay, is found in northern Quebec (Kuujjuaq, Whale River, and George River), throughout Labrador and Nova Scotia, and in southeastern Quebec (Mingan and Blanc-Sablon). It was described by Ridgway in 1882.
- P. c. obscurus, described by Ridgway in 1874, is native to the coastal strip from Washington (Crescent Lake, Seattle, and Columbia River) through western Oregon to northwestern California (Humboldt County). Also known as the Oregon jay, this subspecies has more dark brown than grey upperparts.
- P. c. pacificus ranges from central Alaska to northwestern Canada, including the Yukon and along the Mackenzie River. It was described by Johann Friedrich Gmelin in 1788.
- P. c. sanfordi is found in Newfoundland. Harry C. Oberholser described it in 1914 from a specimen collected by a Dr. Sanford, whom he named it after. Oberholser reported that it was smaller and darker than the nominate race P. c. canadensis and more closely resembled P. c. nigricapillus.

Two additional subspecies were formerly recognized:

- P. c. arcus was the name given to populations that are found in the Rainbow Mountains area and headwaters of the Dean and Bella Coola Rivers of the central Coast Ranges, British Columbia. Described by Miller in 1950, it is often recognized as P. c. obscurus.
- P. c. barbouri was described by Allan Brooks in 1920. Abundant on Anticosti Island in eastern Quebec, this subspecies is significantly heavier but not larger than other Canada jay subspecies in Quebec, and does not appear to be genetically distinct from P. c. nigricapillus or other populations in Quebec.
P. c. obscurus, Mt Rainier Washington State

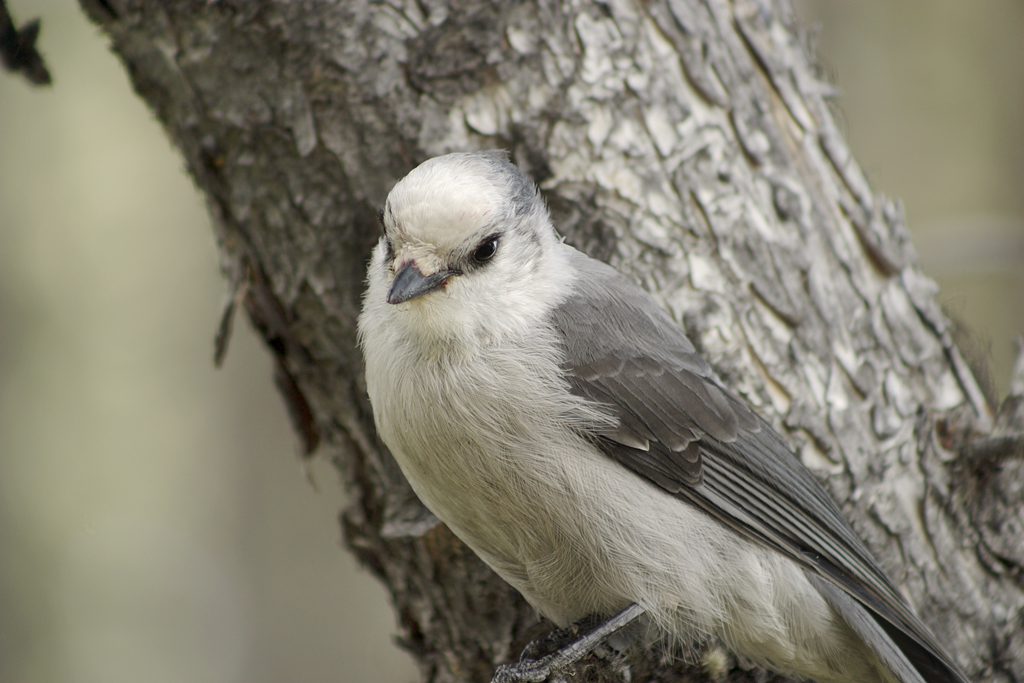
P. c. capitalis, Grand Tetons, Wyoming

== Description ==
The Canada jay is a relatively large songbird, though smaller than other jays. A typical adult Canada jay is between 25 and 33 cm (9.8 and 13.0 in) long. Its wingspan is around 45 cm (18 in). It weighs about 65 to 70 g (2.3 to 2.5 oz). Adults have medium grey back feathers with a lighter grey underside. Its head is mostly white with a dark grey or black nape and hood, with a short black beak and dark eyes. The long tail is medium grey with lighter tips. The legs and feet are black. The plumage is thick, providing insulation in the bird's cold native habitat. Like most corvids, Canada jays are not sexually dimorphic, but males are slightly larger than females. Juveniles are initially coloured very dark grey all over, gaining adult plumage after a first moult in July or August. The average lifespan of territory-owning Canada jays is eight years; the oldest known Canada jay banded and recaptured in the wild was at least 17 years old.

A variety of vocalizations are used and, like other corvids, Canada jays may mimic other bird species, especially predators. A survey of Canada Jay recordings found that they can mimic the vocalizations of at least 40 species of birds, as well those of red squirrels and domestic cats. Calls include a whistled quee-oo, and various clicks and chuckles. When predators are spotted, the bird announces a series of harsh clicks to signal a threat on the ground, or a series of repeated whistles to indicate a predator in the air.

== Distribution and habitat ==
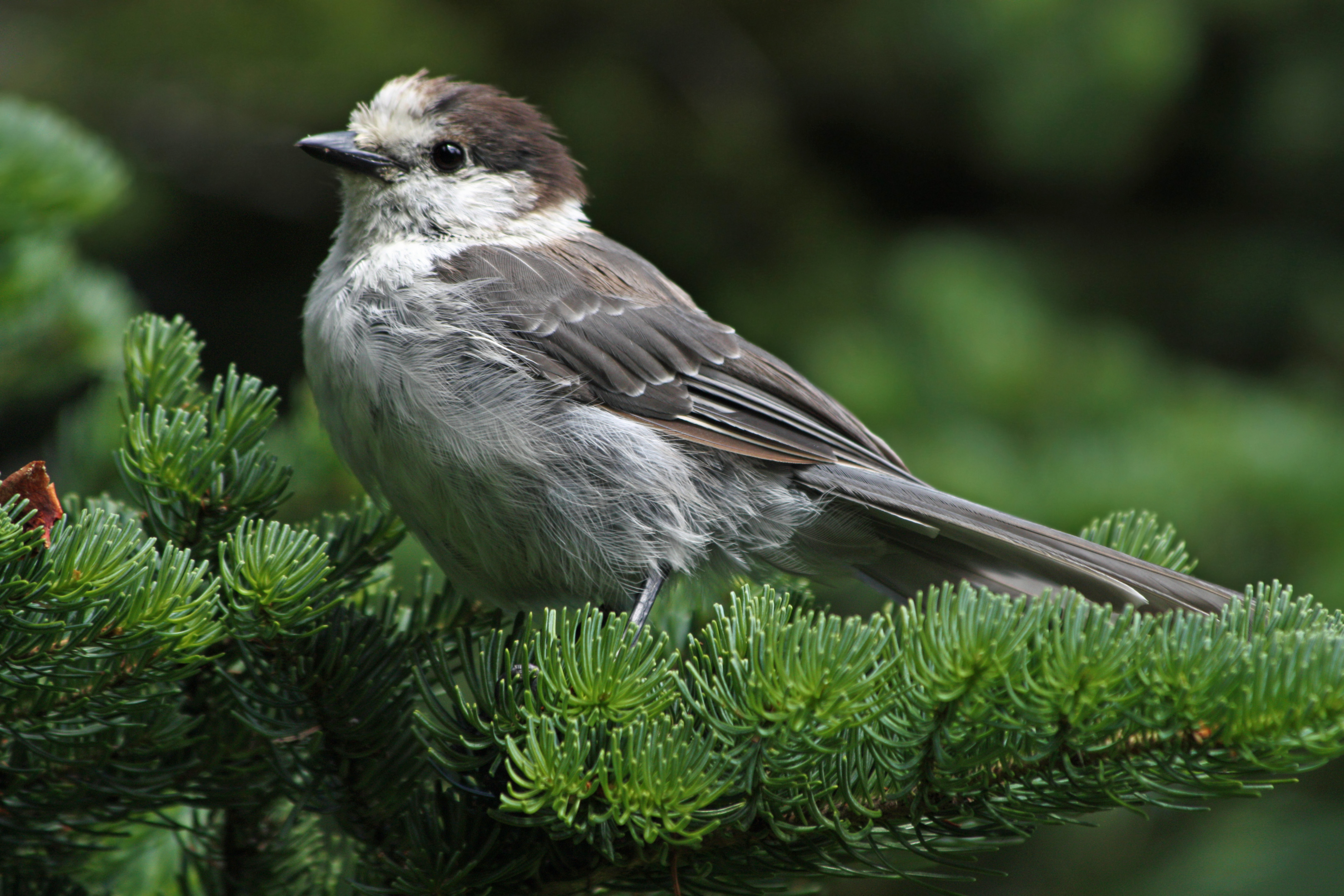
Perisoreus canadensis obscurus in Mount Rainier National Park

The Canada jay's range spans across northern North America, from northern Alaska east to Newfoundland and Labrador, and south to northern California, Idaho, Utah, east-central Arizona, north-central New Mexico, central Colorado, and southwestern South Dakota. It is also found in the northern reaches of the states of Minnesota, Wisconsin, Michigan, the Adirondacks in New York, and New England. The Canada jay may wander north of the breeding range. In winter it travels irregularly to northwestern Nebraska, central Minnesota, southeastern Wisconsin, central Michigan, southern Pennsylvania, central New York, Connecticut, and Massachusetts. Fossil evidence indicates the Canada jay was found as far south as Tennessee during the last ice age.

The vast majority of Canada jays live where there is a strong presence of black spruce (Picea mariana), white spruce (P. glauca), Engelmann spruce (P. engelmannii), jack pine (Pinus banksiana), or lodgepole pine (P. contorta). Canada jays do not inhabit the snowy, coniferous, and therefore seemingly appropriate Sierra Nevada of California where no spruce occur. Nor do Canada jays live in lower elevations of coastal Alaska or British Columbia dominated by Sitka spruce (Picea sitchensis). The key habitat requirements may be sufficiently cold temperatures to ensure successful storage of perishable food and tree bark with sufficiently pliable scales arranged in a shingle-like configuration that allows Canada jays to wedge food items easily up into dry, concealed storage locations. Storage may also be assisted by the antibacterial properties of the bark and foliage of boreal tree species. An exception to this general picture may be the well-marked subspecies P. c. obscurus. It lives right down to the coast from Washington to northern California in the absence of cold temperatures or the putatively necessary tree species.

== Behaviour ==
=== Mating ===
The Canada jay typically breeds at two years of age. Monogamous pairs remain together for life, though a bird will pair up with a new partner if it is widowed. Breeding takes place during March and April, depending on latitude, in permanent, all-purpose territories. Second broods are not attempted, perhaps allowing greater time for food storage.

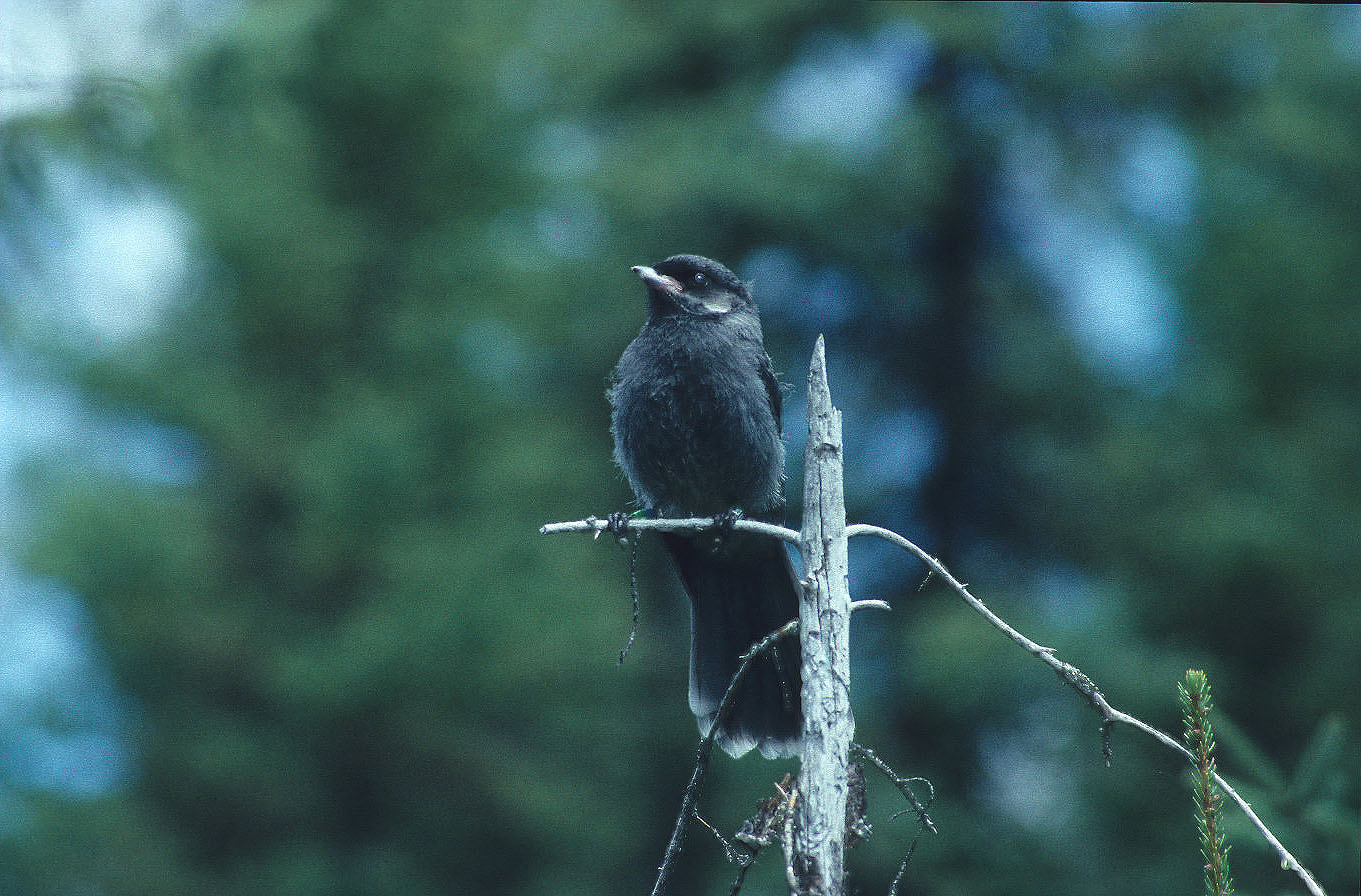
Grey, sooty plumage of a juvenile

Breeding is cooperative. During the nest-building phase of the breeding season, Canada jay breeding pairs are accompanied by a third, juvenile bird. A 1991 field study in Quebec and Ontario found that approximately 65% of Canada jay trios included a dominant juvenile from the pair's previous breeding season, and approximately 30% of trios included non-dominant juveniles who had left their parents' territory. Occasionally, two nonbreeding juveniles accompany a pair of adults. The role of juveniles is in allofeeding (food sharing) by retrieving caches and bringing food to younger siblings, but this is only allowed by the parents during the post-fledgling period. Until then, parents will drive the other birds away from the nest. This may reduce the frequency of predator-attracting visits to the nest when young are most vulnerable. The benefits of juveniles participating in subsequent brood care may include "lightening the load" for the breeding pair, which may possibly increase longevity, reducing the probability of starvation of nestlings, and detecting and mobbing predators near the nest. Dominant juveniles may eventually inherit the natal territory and breed, while unrelated juveniles may eventually fill a vacancy nearby or form a new breeding pair on previously unoccupied ground.

=== Nesting ===
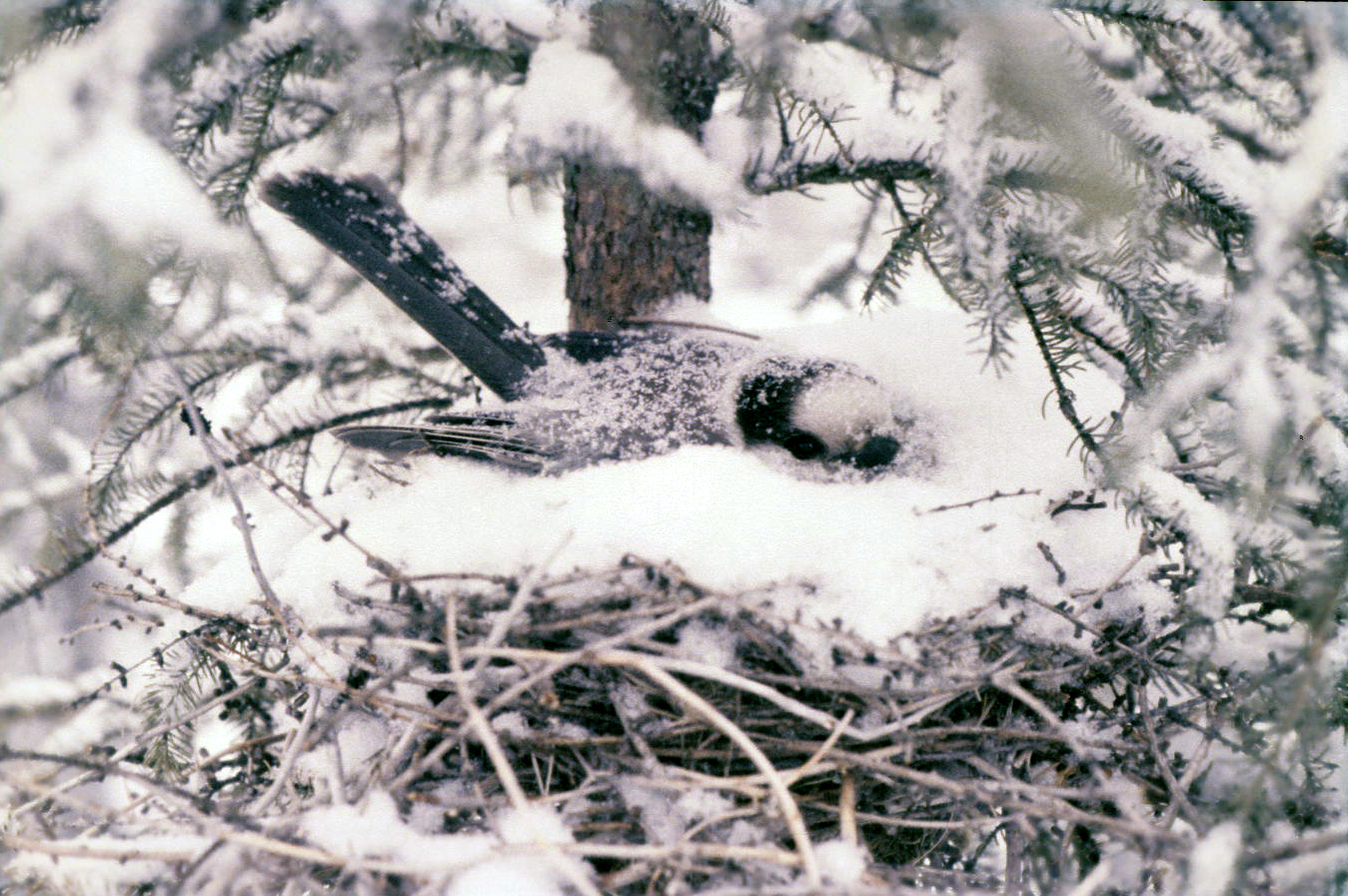
Female incubating her eggs

Breeding Canada jays build nests and lay eggs in March or even February, when snow is deep in the boreal forest. Male Canada jays choose a nest site in a mature conifer tree; the nests are found most commonly in black spruce, with white spruce and balsam fir (Abies balsamea) also used, in Ontario and Quebec. With the male taking a lead role in construction, nests are constructed with brittle dead twigs pulled off of trees, as well as bark strips and lichens. The cup is just large enough to contain the female and her eggs, measuring about 3 in (76 mm) wide and 2 in (51 mm) deep. Insulation is provided by cocoons of the forest tent caterpillar (Malacosoma disstria) filling the interstitial spaces of the nest, and feathers used to line the cup. Nests are usually built on the southwestern side of a tree for solar warming and are usually less than one nest diameter from the trunk. Nest height is typically 8 to 30 ft (2.4 to 9.1 m) above the ground. The average height of 264 nests surveyed in Algonquin Provincial Park was 16 ± 9.2 ft (4.9 ± 2.8 m) above ground.

A clutch consists of 2 to 5 light green-grey eggs with darker spots. The mean clutch sizes of Canada jays in Algonquin Provincial Park and La Verendrye Provincial Park were 3.03 and 3.18 eggs, respectively. Incubation is performed only by the female and lasts an average of 18.5 days. The female is fed on the nest by her partner, rarely moving from the nest during incubation and for several days after hatching.

=== Fledging ===
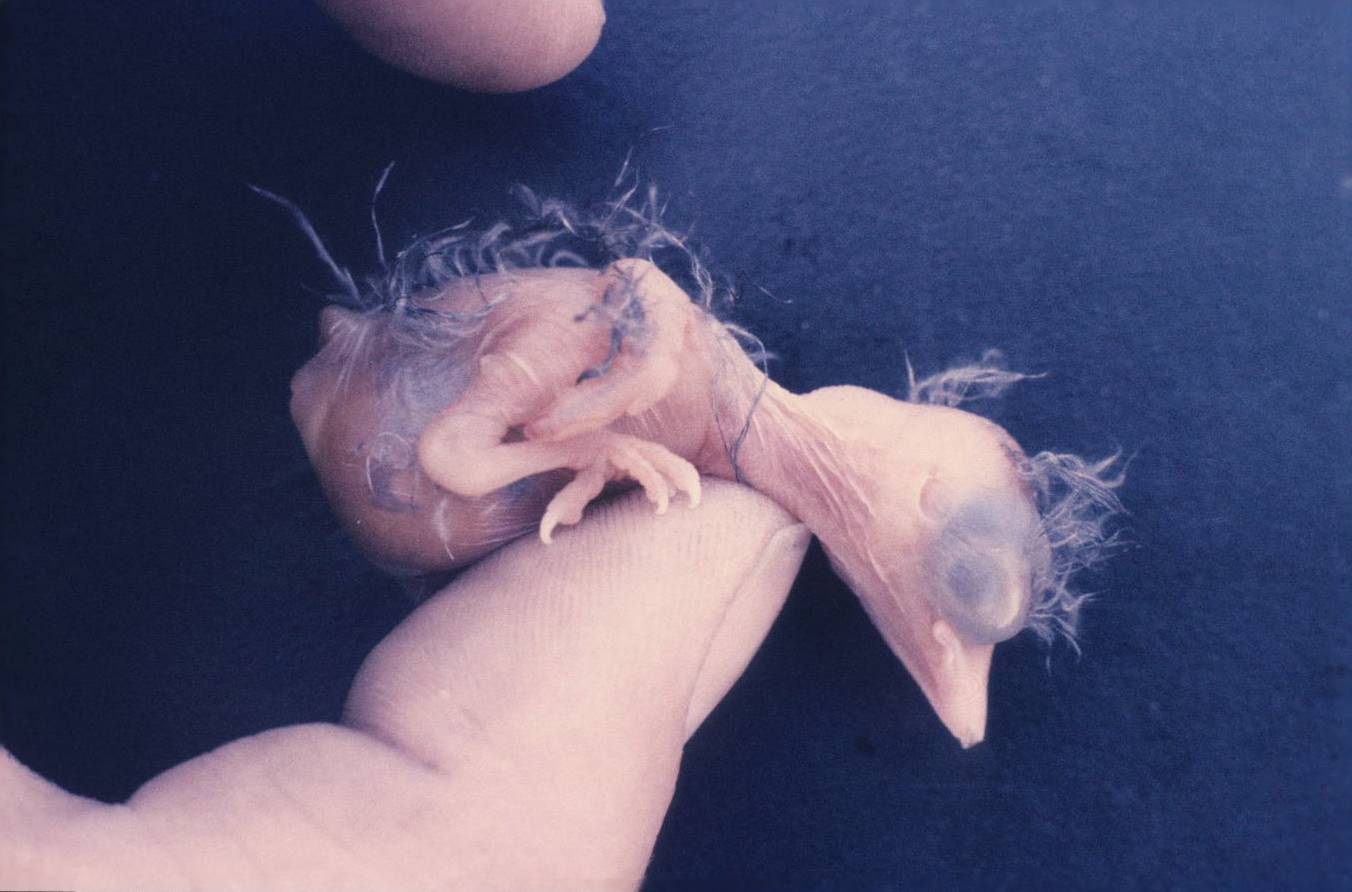
A hatchling

Canada jay young are altricial. For the first three to four days after hatching, the female remains on the nest; when the male arrives with food, both parents help in feeding the nestlings. Nestling growth is most rapid from the fourth through the tenth day following hatching, during which time the female begins to participate in foraging. The parents carry food to the nest in their throats. The accompanying nonbreeding third bird does not help with feeding during this period but is driven away by the parents if it approaches the nest. Food is a dark brown, viscous paste containing primarily arthropods. Young Canada jays leave the nest between 22 and 24 days after hatching, after which the third bird begins to participate in foraging and feeding. Natal dispersal distance for the Canada jay is a median of 0.0 km for males, 2.8 km (1.7 mi) for females, and a maximum distance of 11.3 km (7.0 mi) for males and females.

After 55 to 65 days, juveniles reach full adult measurements and battle among themselves until a dominant juvenile forces its siblings to leave the natal area. The dominant bird remains with its parents until the following season, while its siblings leave the natal territory to join an unrelated pair who failed to breed. In a study by Dan Strickland, two-thirds of dominant juveniles were male.

=== Survival ===
In studies conducted in Ontario and Quebec, the mortality rate for dominant juveniles was 52%, and mortality was 85% for juveniles who left the parents' territory between fledging in June to approximately mid-October. From fall to the following breeding season in March, further juvenile mortality was 50%. Territory-holding adult Canada jays experienced low mortality rates (15.1 and 18.2% for males and females, respectively). The oldest known Canada jay recaptured in the wild was at least 17 years old.

=== Feeding ===
Canada jays are omnivorous. They hunt such prey as arthropods, worms, small mammals including rodents, shrews, and juvenile bats, eggs, and nestling birds, and have even been recorded taking a magnolia warbler (Dendroica magnolia) in flight. They have been reported to opportunistically hunt young amphibians such as the western chorus frog (Pseudacris triseriata) in Chambers Lake, Colorado, and the long-toed salamander (Ambystoma macrodactylum) in Whitehorse Bluff in Crater Lake National Park, Oregon. Canada jays have been seen landing on moose (Alces alces) to remove and eat engorged winter ticks (Dermacentor albipictus) during April and May in Algonquin Provincial Park. Researchers also found a Canada jay nest containing a brooding female, three hatchlings, and three warm, engorged winter deer ticks. Because the ticks were too large for the hatchlings to eat, it was hypothesized that the ticks may have served as "hot water bottles", keeping hatchlings warm when parents were away from the nest.

Nestling birds are common prey, being taken more often from nests in trees rather than on the ground. Canada jays find them by moving from perch to perch and scanning surroundings. Avian nest predation by Canada jays is not necessarily higher in fragmented versus unfragmented forest. Evidence from studies in the Pacific Northwest suggest a moderate increase in nest predation in logged plots adjacent to mature conifer forest, which is the Canada jay's preferred habitat. Studies of nest predation by Canada jays in Quebec have shown that the birds prefer preying on nests in open forest with high prominence of jack pine, and greater rates of predation in riparian forest strips and green-tree retention stands versus clearcuts. This may be due to increased availability of perch sites for avian predators such as the Canada jay. Canada jays are suspected but not proven to prey on nests of the threatened marbled murrelet (Brachyramphus marmoratus) in coastal areas of the Pacific Northwest.

Carrion, fungi, fruits such as chokecherry (Prunus virginiana), and seeds are also eaten. They've been known to use bird feeders provided by humans. Two Canada jays were seen eating slime mold (Fuligo septica) near Kennedy Hot Springs in the Glacier Peak Wilderness, Washington. This was the first report of any bird consuming slime mold in the field. Risk and energy expenditure are factors in food selection for the Canada jay, which selects food on the basis of profitability to maximize caloric intake. Increased handling, searching, or recognition times for a preferred food item lowers its profitability. Canada jays wrench, twist, and tug food apart, unlike other birds known as jays (such as the blue jay, Cyanocitta cristata), which grasp and hammer their food. Canada jays commonly carry large food items to nearby trees to eat or process for storage, possibly as defence against large scavengers.

=== Caching ===
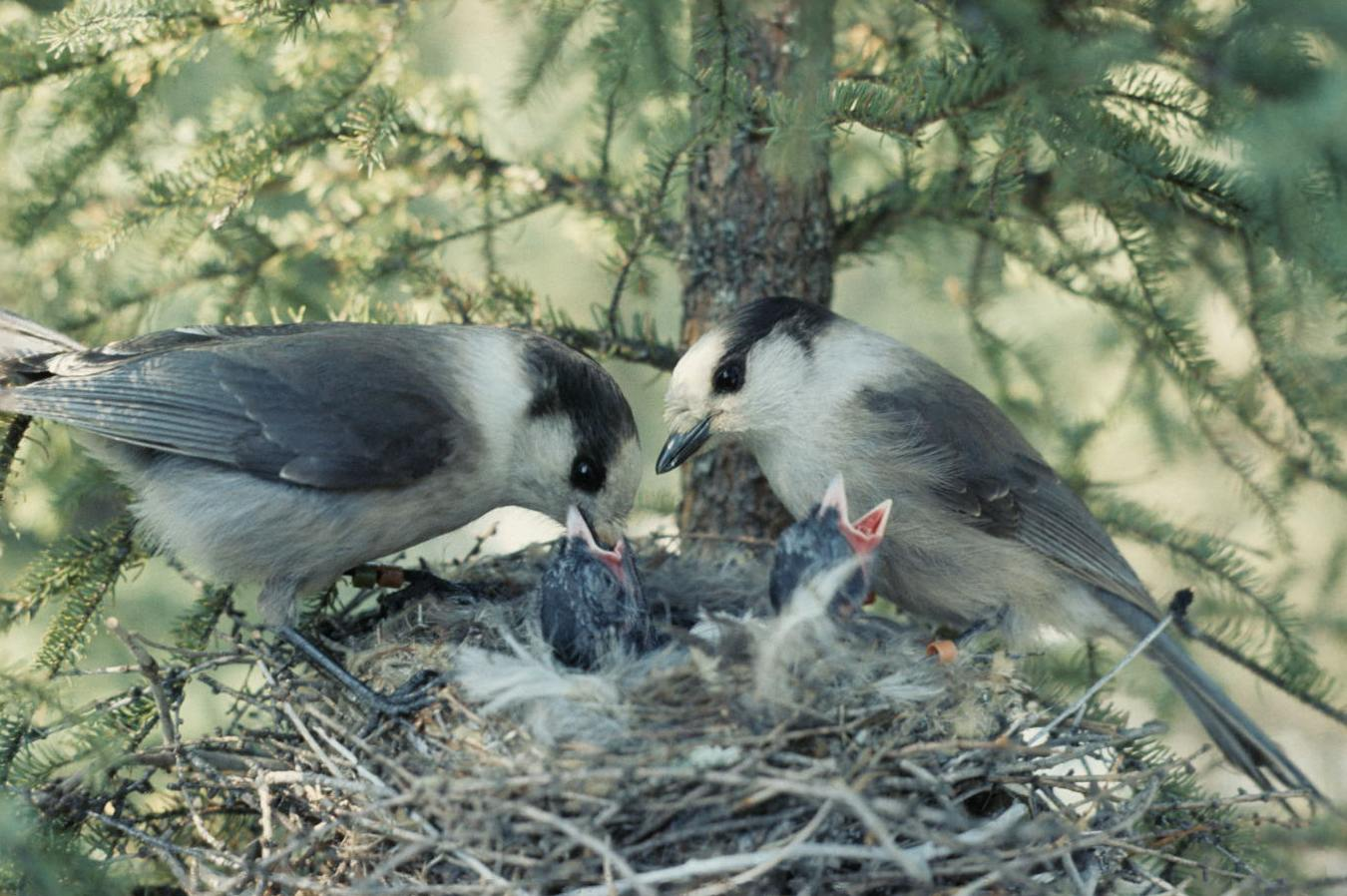
Pair of jays feeding their nestlings

The Canada jay is a "scatterhoarder", caching thousands of food items during the summer for use the following winter, and enabling the species to remain in boreal and subalpine forests year round. Any food intended for storage is manipulated in the mouth and formed into a bolus that is coated with sticky saliva, adhering to anything it touches. The bolus is stored in bark crevices, under tufts of lichen, or among conifer needles. Cached items can be anything from carrion to bread crumbs. A single Canada jay may hide thousands of pieces of food per year, to later recover them by memory, sometimes months after hiding them. Cached food is sometimes used to feed nestlings and fledglings.

When exploiting distant food sources found in clearings, Canada jays were observed temporarily concentrating their caches in an arboreal site along the edge of a black spruce forest in interior Alaska. This allowed a high rate of caching in the short term and reduced the jay's risk of predation. A subsequent recaching stage occurred, and food items were transferred to widely scattered sites to reduce theft.

Caching is inhibited by the presence of Steller's jays (Cyanocitta stelleri) and Canada jays from adjacent territories, which follow resident Canada jays to steal cached food. Canada jays carry large food items to distant cache sites for storage more often than small food items. To prevent theft, they also tend to carry valuable food items further from the source when caching in the company of one or more Canada jays. Scatterhoarding discourages pilferage by competitors, while increased cache density leads to increased thievery. In southern portions of the Canada jay's range, food is not cached during summer because of the chance of spoilage and the reduced need for winter stores.

== Predators ==
Several bird species prey on Canada jays from as small as northern pygmy owls (Glaucidium californicum) to as large as golden eagles (Aquila chrysaetos), including great grey owls (Strix nebulosa), northern hawk-owls (Surnia ulula), and Mexican spotted owls (Strix occidentalis lucida). Canada jay remains have been recovered from the lairs of fisher (Pekania pennanti) and American marten (Martes americana). Red squirrels (Tamiasciurus hudsonicus) eat Canada jay eggs. Canada jays alert each other to threats by whistling alarm notes, screaming, chattering, or imitating and/or mobbing predators.

== Relationship with humans ==
=== Cultural significance ===
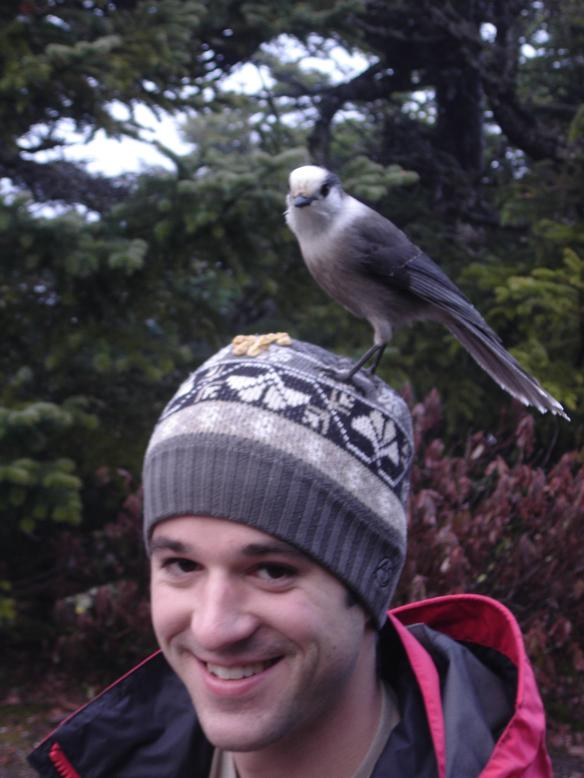
A bold Canada jay, typical of those individuals accustomed to humans

Found throughout Canada, the bird is popularly known by several colloquial names. One is "whisky jack", a variation on the name of Wisakedjak, a benevolent trickster and cultural hero in Cree, Algonquin, and Menominee mythologies. Alternate spellings for this name include wesakechak, wiskedjak, whiskachon, and wisakadjak. The Tlingit people of northwestern North America know it as kooyéix or taatl'eeshdéi, "camp robber". According to the Mi'kmaq of Nova Scotia, the star Eta Ursae Majoris in the night sky was a Canada jay, Mikjaqoqwej. In anishinaabemowin, or the Ojibwe language, the bird is known as gwiingwiishi. "... the whisky jack is revered by indigenous peoples as an omen of good fortune and a warning of danger. Niigaanwewidam Sinclair, an associate professor and acting head of the department of native studies at the University of Manitoba, explained why the mischievous yet wise grey jay is important to the Anishinaabe people. "To my people, the Anishinaabe, she is Gwiingwiishi", Sinclair said in a post published by Canadian Geographic magazine. "Gwiingwiishi is a great, wise teacher, and there is an old story that tells of her abilities to give gifts... Her lesson? That it is only in our bravery, resilience and commitments to one another that we can find growth", Sinclair said.

The Canada jay readily capitalizes on novel food sources, including taking advantage of man-made sources of food. To the frustration of trappers using baits to catch fur-bearing animals or early travellers trying to protect their winter food supplies, and to the delight of campers, bold Canada jays are known to approach humans for treats and to steal from unattended food stores. Canada jays do not change their feeding behaviour if watched by people; if they are able to link humans with food, they will not forget. A nesting female that had become accustomed to being fed by humans was reportedly able to be enticed to leave the nest during incubation and brooding. This behaviour has inspired a number of nicknames for the Canada jay, including "lumberjack", "meat-bird", "venison-hawk", "moose-bird", and "gorby", the last two popular in the northeastern United States. The origin of "gorby", also spelt "gorbey", is unclear but possibly derived from gorb, which in Scottish Gaelic or Irish means "glutton" or "greedy (animal)" or in Scots or northern English "fledgling bird".

Superstition in Maine and New Brunswick relates how woodsmen would not harm gorbeys, believing that whatever they inflicted on the bird would be done to them. A folk tale circulated about a man who plucked a gorbey of its feathers and woke up the next morning having lost all his hair. Although the story was widespread in the early to mid-20th century, it does not appear to have been extant in 1902. Another legend from the North American lumberjacks says that lumberjacks who die are reincarnated as Canada jays (with "moose birds" being their preferred term).

In January 2015, The Royal Canadian Geographical Society's magazine, Canadian Geographic, announced a project to select a national bird for Canada, a designation which the country has never formally recognized. Dubbed the National Bird Project, the organization conducted an online poll inviting Canadians to vote for their favourite bird. The poll closed on 31 August 2016, and a panel of experts convened the following month to review the top five selections: the Canada jay, common loon (Gavia immer), snowy owl (Bubo scandiacus), Canada goose (Branta canadensis) and black-capped chickadee (Poecile atricapillus). The project announced on 16 November 2016 that the Canada jay was selected as the winner of the contest. Organizers hoped for the Canadian government to formally recognize the result as part of Canada's sesquicentennial celebrations in 2017; the Department of Canadian Heritage responded that no new official symbol proposals were being considered at the time.

=== Conservation ===
Canada jays are classified as least concern (LC) according to the IUCN Red List, having stable populations over a very large area of boreal and subalpine habitats only lightly occupied by humans. Significant human impacts may nevertheless occur through anthropogenic climate warming. Canada jays at the northern edges of their range may benefit from the extension of spruce stands out onto formerly treeless tundra. A study of a declining population at the southern end of the Canada jay's range linked the decline in reproductive success to warmer temperatures in preceding autumns. Such warm temperatures may trigger spoilage of the perishable food items stored by Canada jays upon which success of late winter nesting partly depends.
