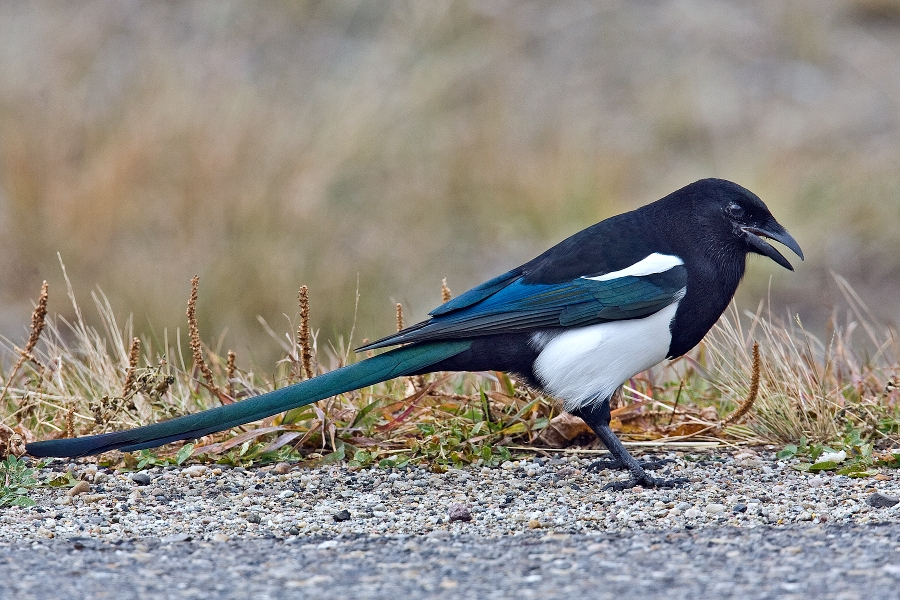
- Black-billed magpie in Alberta.

Scientific classification
- Kingdom: Animalia
- Phylum: Chordata
- Class: Aves
- Order: Passeriformes
- Family: Corvidae
- Subfamily: Corvinae; Vigors, 1825

Genera
- Zavattariornis; Ptilostomus; Podoces; Garrulus; Pica; Nucifraga; Coloeus; Corvus

= Corvinae =

Subfamily of birds

Corvinae is one of six subfamilies in the crow family (Corvidae). It comprises 64 species, which are spread over seven genera.

- Corvidae
  - - Pyrrhocoracinae
      Pyrrhocorax
  - - - Crypsirininae
        - Dendrocitta
        - - Crypsirina
          - - Temnurus
            - Platysmurus
    - - - Cissinae
          - Urocissa
          - Cissa
      - - - Perisoreinae
            - Perisoreus
            - Cyanopica
        - - Cyanocoracinae
            - - - Cyanocorax
                - - Calocitta
                  - Psilorhinus
              - - Aphelocoma
                - - Cyanocitta
                  - Gymnorhinus
            - Cyanolyca
          - Corvinae
            - - Corvus sensu lato
                - Corvus
                - Coloeus
              - Nucifraga
            - - - Pica
                - Garrulus
              - - - Podoces
                  - Ptilostomus
                - Zavattariornis
- Laniidae
