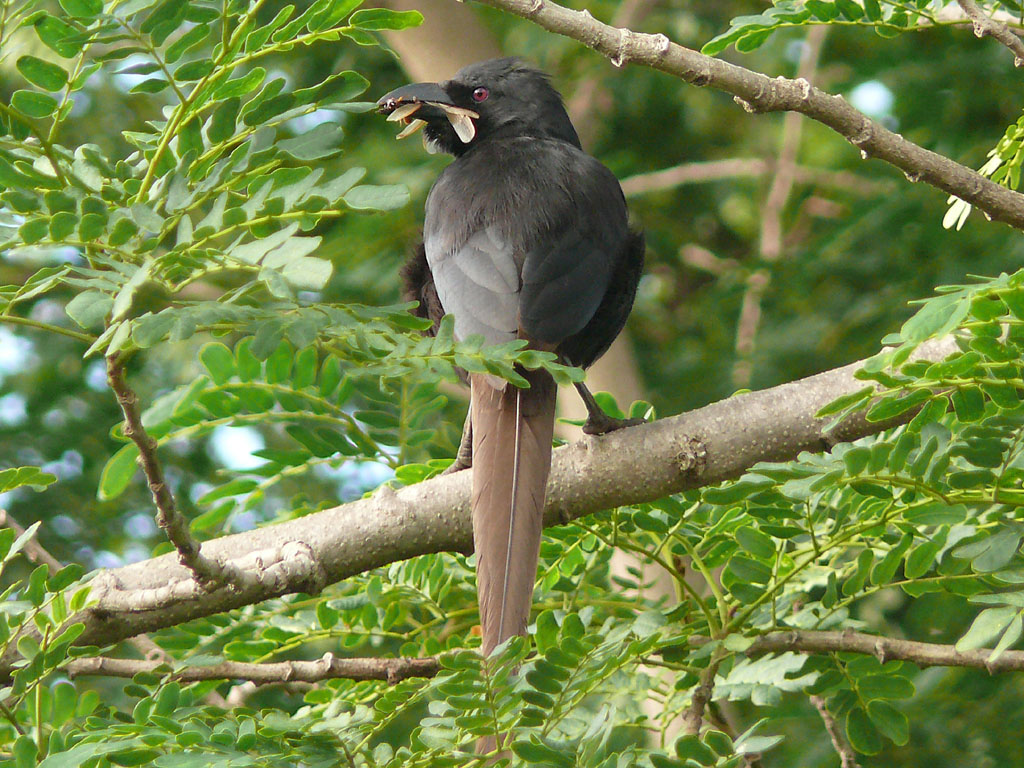
- adult with beak full of termites
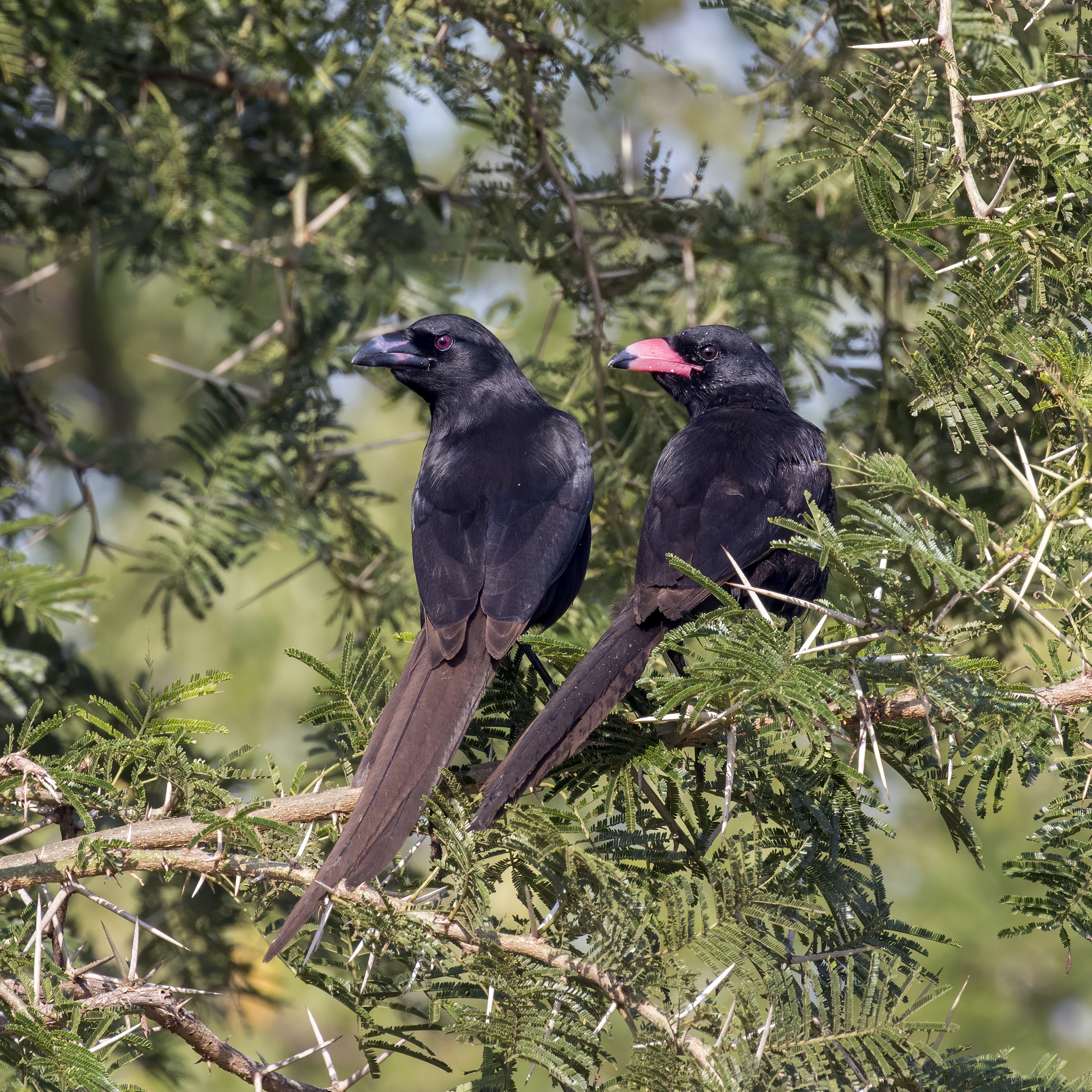
- sub-adult (l) and immature (r); Semliki Wildlife Reserve, Uganda

Conservation status
- Least Concern (IUCN 3.1)

Scientific classification
- Kingdom: Animalia
- Phylum: Chordata
- Class: Aves
- Order: Passeriformes
- Family: Corvidae
- Subfamily: Corvinae
- Genus: Ptilostomus; Swainson, 1837
- Species: P. afer

Binomial name
- Ptilostomus afer (Linnaeus, 1766)
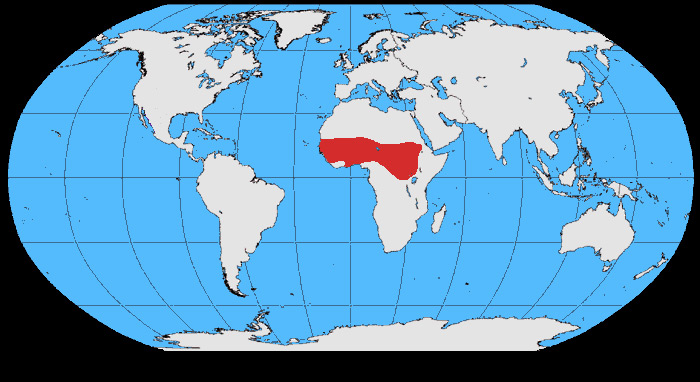
- Distribution map

Synonyms
- Corvus afer Linnaeus, 1766

= Piapiac =

Species of bird

The piapiac (Ptilostomus afer) is an African bird in the crow family, and is the only member of the genus Ptilostomus. It is most closely related to the Central Asian ground jays.

== Taxonomy ==
In 1760 the French zoologist Mathurin Jacques Brisson included a description of the piapiac in his Ornithologie based on a specimen collected in Senegal. He used the French name La pie du Sénégal and the Latin Pica Senegalensis. Although Brisson coined Latin names, these do not conform to the binomial system and are not recognised by the International Commission on Zoological Nomenclature. When in 1766 the Swedish naturalist Carl Linnaeus updated his Systema Naturae for the twelfth edition, he added 240 species that had been previously described by Brisson. One of these was the piapiac. Linnaeus included a brief description, coined the binomial name Corvus afer and cited Brisson's work. The specific name afer is Latin for "Africa". The piapiac is the only species placed in the genus Ptilostomus that was introduced by the English naturalist William Swainson in 1837. The species is monotypic.

A molecular phylogenetic study published in 2005 found that the piapiac from Africa was most closely related to the ground jays in the genus Podoces that inhabit Central Asia.

== Description ==
In size it is a little smaller and slimmer than the European magpie (Pica pica) though the bill is relatively thicker. It is 35–42 cm (14–17 in) in length and weighs 121–130 g (4.3–4.6 oz). The overall colouring is black with the feathers quite silky in texture and having a purplish gloss in good light. The base of the tail tends to be more brown in colour than the rest of the body. Unusual for a passerine it has 10 rather than 12 tail feathers. The nasal plumes are somewhat upturned on top of the bill but fully cover the nostrils. The bill itself is black in the adult but partly reddish-pink towards the base in juvenile specimens. The bird's legs and feet are black and the iris is variable, but tends towards violet, purple or mauve with a bluish-purple outer ring. The voice is usually described as a shrill squeaking often with the jackdaw-like overtones. There is also a croaking alarm call given in anger where the head bobs.

== Distribution and habitat ==
The range of the species is the tropical equatorial region of central Africa from Senegal on the west coast, eastwards in a broad band to Sudan and southern Ethiopia. Within this range, its favoured habitat is towards more open country of cultivated land with fields and pasture and small associated towns and villages.

== Behaviour ==
=== Feeding ===
Food is obtained in flocks of ten or more birds moving together on the ground including insects and other invertebrates but will take a degree of carrion, possibly attracted as much by the associated insects this attracts as much as the meat itself. Some fruit is also taken in trees, with the oily fruit of the oil palm (Elaeis guineensis) being a favourite. Able to run fast with some agility, it tends to hop at slower speed and will catch insects disturbed by the feet of cattle, sometimes hitching a ride on their backs and darting out to catch the prey.

=== Breeding ===
The piapiac often nests in a palm tree, but other nesting sites are also used. Strips of palm leaf and grass stems are cemented together with mud and lined with palm fibre to form a cup, in which three to seven eggs are laid between March and April. Piapiac eggs are very pale blue, or greenish-blue with a few brown blotches.

== External image links ==
- Photos and videos on Birds of the world
