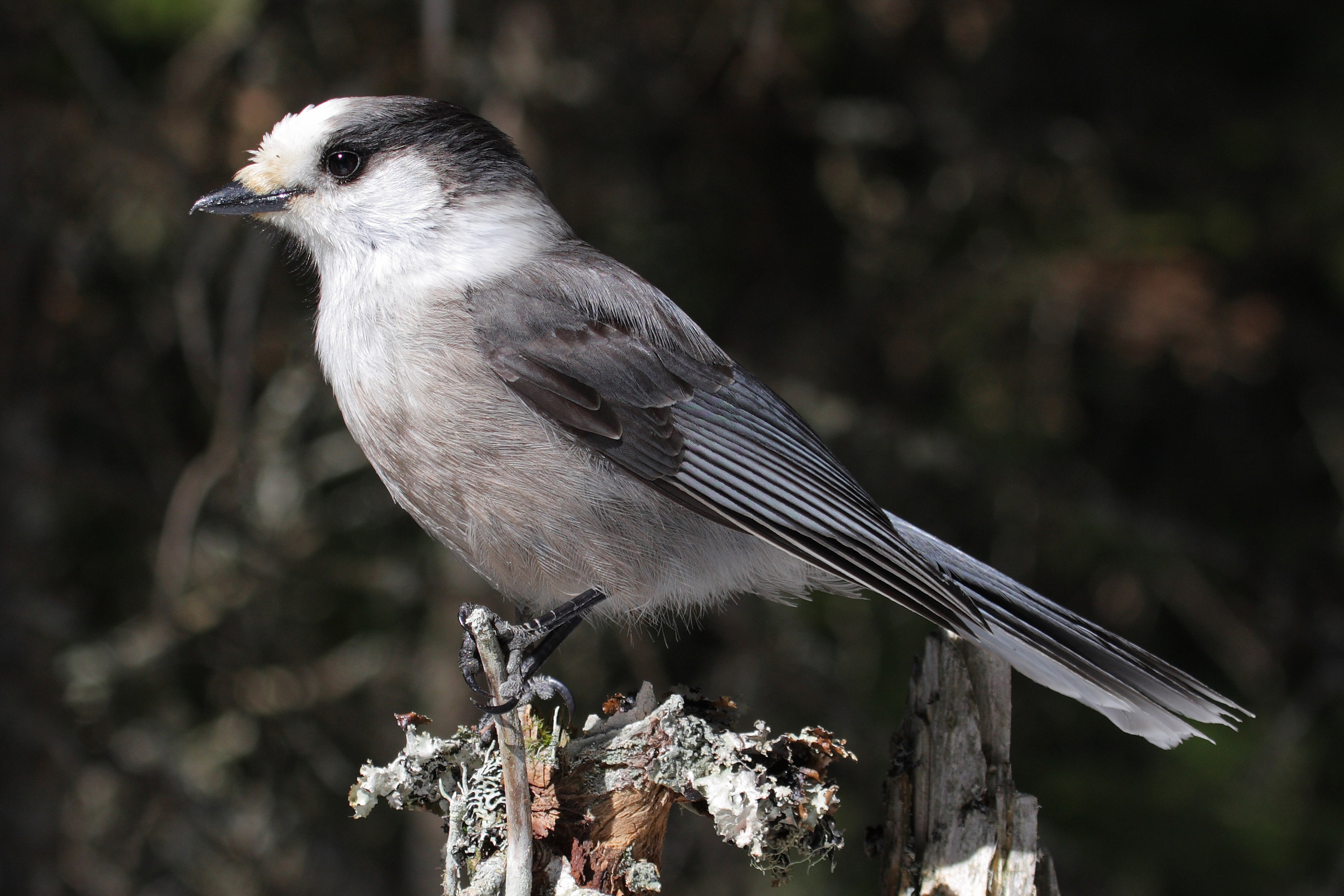
- Canada jay (Perisoreus canadensis)

Scientific classification
- Kingdom: Animalia
- Phylum: Chordata
- Class: Aves
- Order: Passeriformes
- Family: Corvidae
- Subfamily: Perisoreinae
- Genus: Perisoreus; Bonaparte, 1831

Type species
- Corvus canadensis Linnaeus, 1766

= Perisoreus =

Genus of birds

The genus Perisoreus is a very small genus of jays from the Boreal regions of North America and Eurasia from Scandinavia to the Asian seaboard. An isolated species also occurs in north-western Sichuan of China. They belong to the Passerine order of birds in the family Corvidae. Species of Perisoreus jays are most closely related to the genus Cyanopica.

The genus was introduced by the French zoologist Charles Lucien Bonaparte in 1831. The type species was subsequently designated as the Canada jay. The name of the genus may come from the Ancient Greek perisōreuō "to heap up" or "bury beneath". Alternatively it may be from the Latin peri- "very" or "exceedingly" and sorix, a bird of augury dedicated to Saturn.

== Species ==
The genus contains three species.

Genus Perisoreus – Bonaparte, 1831 – three species
Common name	Scientific name and subspecies	Range	Size and ecology	IUCN status and estimated population
Canada jay	Perisoreus canadensis (Linnaeus, 1766) Nine subspecies: P. c. albescens; P. c. bicolor; P. c. canadensis; P. c. capitalis; P. c. griseus; P. c. nigricapillus; P. c. obscurus; P. c. pacificus; P. c. sanfordi	North America north to the tree line, and in the Rocky Mountains subalpine zone south to New Mexico and Arizona	Size: Habitat: Diet:	LC 26,000,000 ▼
Siberian jay	Perisoreus infaustus (Linnaeus, 1758) Five subspecies: P. i. infaustus (Linnaeus, 1758); P. i. rogosowi Sushkin & Stegmann, 1929; P. i. opicus Bangs, 1913; P. i. sibericus (Boddaert, 1783); P. i. maritimus Buturlin, 1915	north Eurasia	Size: Habitat: Diet:	LC 2,130,000-4,150,000 ▼
Sichuan jay	Perisoreus internigrans (Thayer & Bangs, 1912)	China	Size: Habitat: Diet:	NT 12,000 - 20,500 ▼
