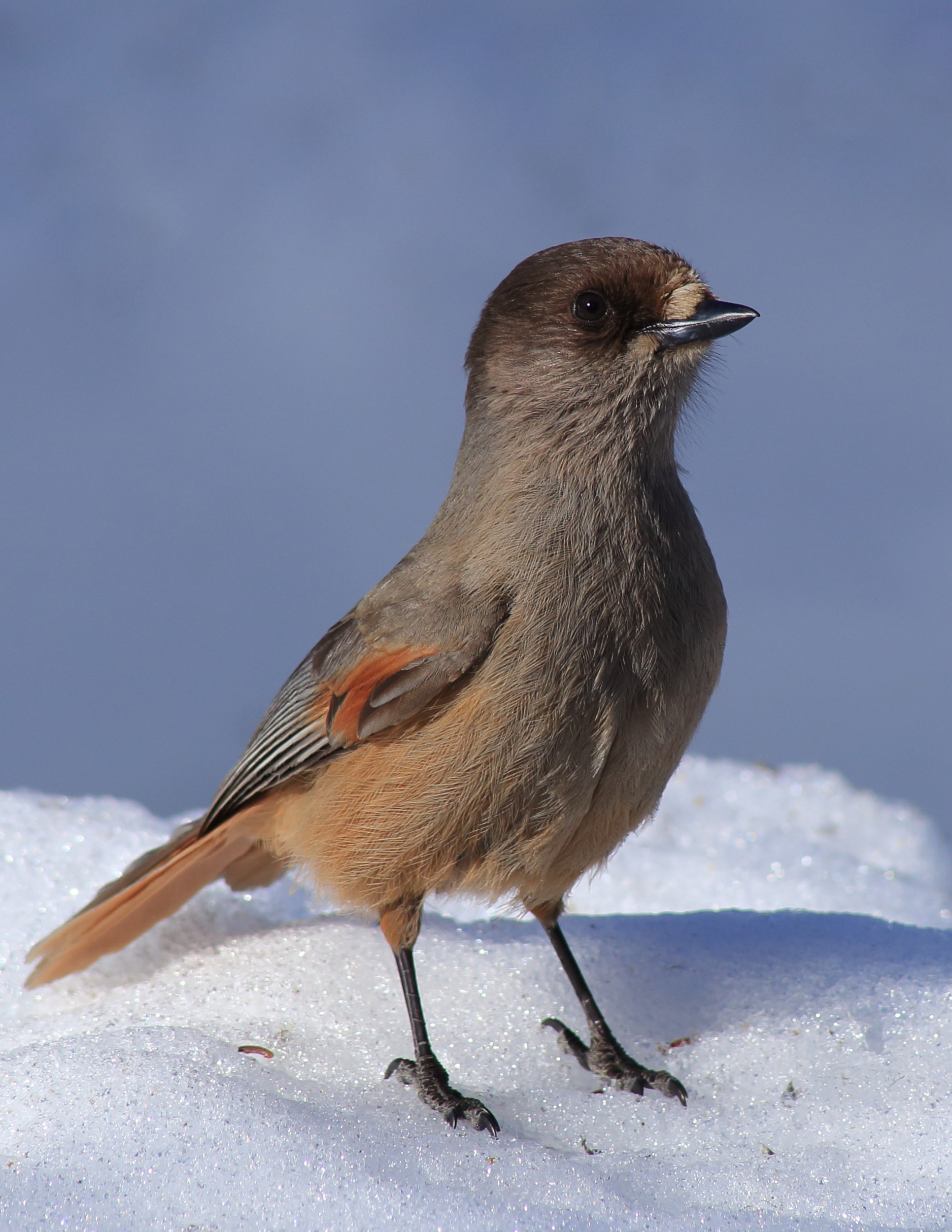
- Near Kittilä, Finland

Conservation status
- Least Concern (IUCN 3.1)

Scientific classification
- Kingdom: Animalia
- Phylum: Chordata
- Class: Aves
- Order: Passeriformes
- Family: Corvidae
- Genus: Perisoreus
- Species: P. infaustus

Binomial name
- Perisoreus infaustus (Linnaeus, 1758)
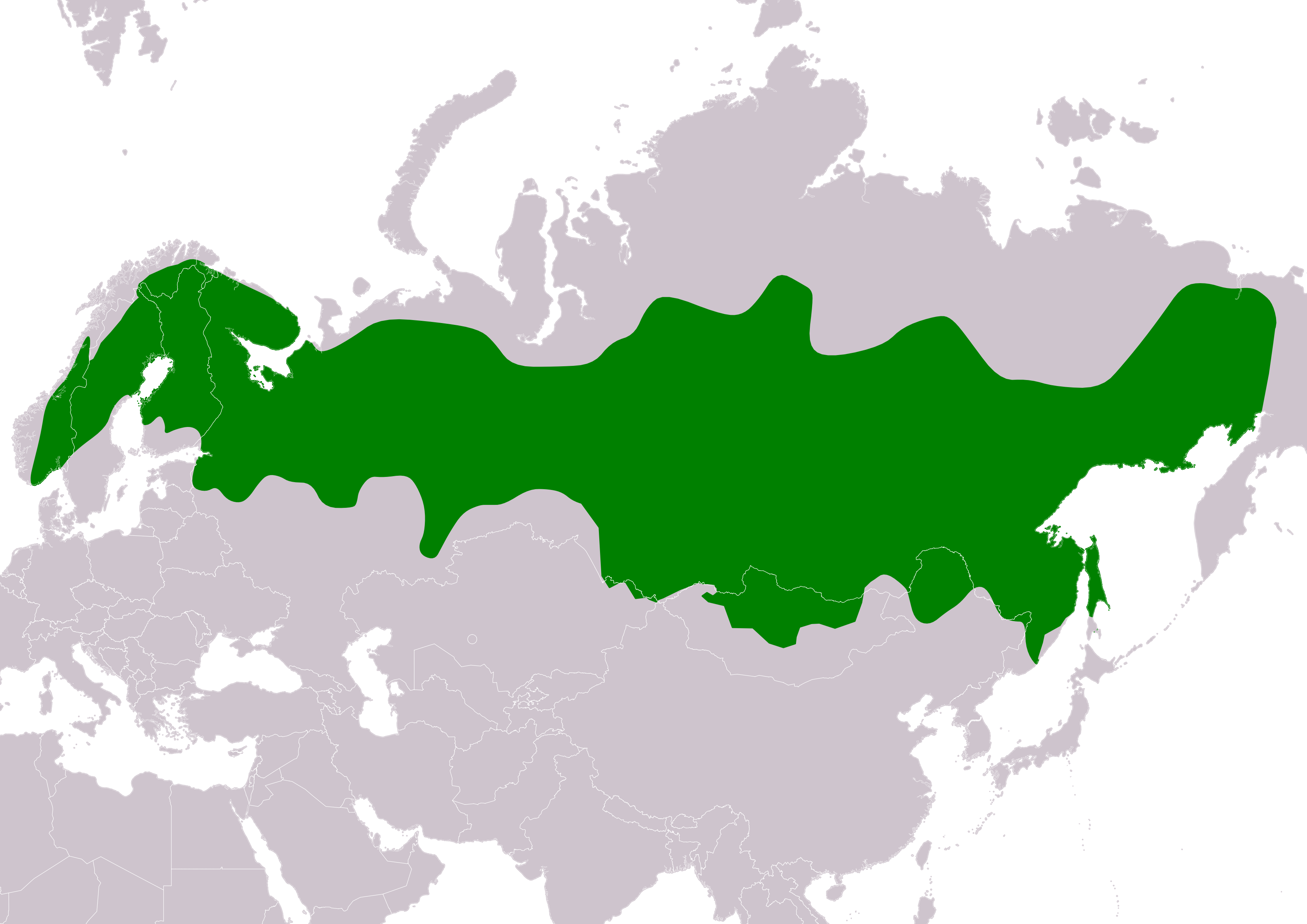
- Current approximate range according to the IUCN

Synonyms
- Corvus infaustus Linnaeus, 1758; Lanius infaustus Linnaeus, 1766

= Siberian jay =

Species of bird

The Siberian jay (Perisoreus infaustus) is a small jay with a widespread distribution within the coniferous forests in North Eurasia. It has grey-brown plumage with a darker brown crown and a paler throat. It is rusty-red in a panel near the wing-bend, on the undertail coverts and on the sides of the tail. The sexes are similar. Although its habitat is being fragmented, it is a common bird with a very wide range so the International Union for Conservation of Nature has assessed its conservation status as being of "least concern".

== Taxonomy and systematics ==
The Siberian jay was formally described by the Swedish naturalist Carl Linnaeus in 1758 in the tenth edition of his Systema Naturae under the binomial name Corvus infaustus. Linnaeus specified the location as "Europae alpinis sylvis" but the type location was restricted to Sweden by Ernst Hartert in 1903. The specific epithet infaustus is Latin meaning "unlucky" or "unfortunate" as Siberian jays were formerly considered a bad omen. The Siberian jay is now placed together with the Canada jay and the Sichuan jay in the genus Perisoreus that was introduced in 1831 by Charles Lucien Bonaparte.

Five subspecies are recognised:

- P. i. infaustus (Linnaeus, 1758) – Scandinavia to west Siberia (includes ruthenus)
- P. i. rogosowi Sushkin & Stegmann, 1929 – northeast European Russia to northcentral Siberia (includes ostjakorum)
- P. i. opicus Bangs, 1913 – east Kazakhstan, northwest China and south central Siberia
- P. i. sibericus (Boddaert, 1783) – central Siberia and north Mongolia (includes yakutensis and tkachenkoi)
- P. i. maritimus Buturlin, 1915 – southeast Siberia and northeast China

The Siberian jay differs from the other two species in its group-living behaviours. Unlike the other two species, where group individuals unrelated to breeding parents may help provision the young, the group individuals accompanying a breeding pair of Siberian jays do not help raise the offspring. The lack of extra-parental care within the groups may be due to historic selection against cooperative breeding in the Siberian jay; probably as an anti-predator strategy to avoid predator attention.

With the colonisation of coniferous forests in Scandinavia just after the last ice age, the Siberian jay probably expanded its range from east to west in response to the newly formed suitable habitat resulting from climatic warming.

== Description ==
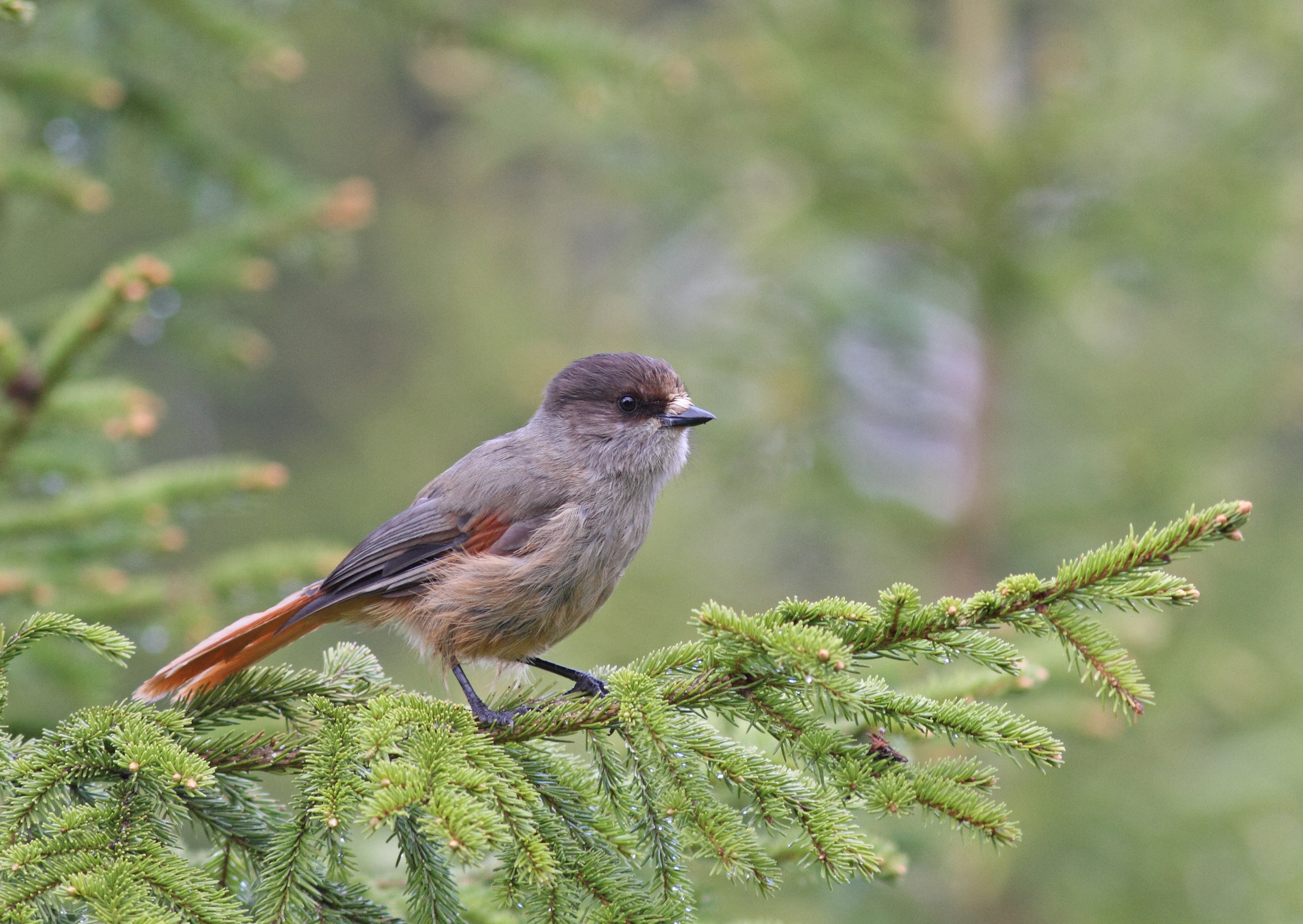
In a spruce forest near Evenstad, Norway

The Siberian jay is the smallest of the western Palearctic corvids, weighing 75 to 90 g (2.6 to 3.2 oz) and measuring about 30 centimetres (12 inches) in length. The adult plumage is greyish brown, with a dark brown head, paler forehead and buff breast. The rump is yellowish and the chin and throat are grey. There is also rufous streaking on the outer feathers, and the bill and legs are black. Their overall colouration is fairly inconspicuous to visually conceal them from predators within their forest habitat. The plumage is also very soft and downy for insulation against extreme cold in winter. There is one moult per year, which lasts from mid-June to mid-September. The longest recorded lifetime is 13 years 4 months for a bird ringed in Finland, although the average lifespan has been reported as 7.1 years.

Siberian jays appear to be specially adapted to navigate in flight through dense forest despite being rather cumbersome flyers across open terrain. This may explain their vulnerability to predation by raptors outside forests.

=== Voice ===
The Siberian jay is mostly silent, but it can emit a loud screech similar to that of a buzzard (Buteo spp.). Both sexes perform the song, which is mainly heard during the breeding season from a short distance away, and it comprises a wide repertoire of sounds. These range from sequences of separate soft and harsh notes to bouts of whistling, creaking and trilling. They are also adept vocal mimics, and have been recorded mimicking the vocalizations of 20 bird species as well as Eurasian red squirrels. Siberian jays also engage in nepotistic alarming calls, which may serve to warn conspecifics of an approaching predator. Experimental studies have shown that warning calls decrease the reaction time of non-breeding individuals in response to an approaching predator and improve their survival rate. However, females seem more able than males to differentiate between kin and non-kin. Alongside directly warning to family group members, a breeding female's nepotistic alarm calls may also divert a predator's attention away from her offspring.

== Distribution and habitat ==
The Siberian jay is resident in the northern boreal spruce, pine, cedar and larch forests stretching from Scandinavia to northern Russia and Siberia. The species has an extensive range, estimated at 19,300,000 square kilometres (7,500,000 square miles) and is native to Norway, Sweden, Finland, Russia, Mongolia, Kazakhstan and China. It is vagrant in Belarus, Estonia, Latvia, Poland, Slovakia and Ukraine. Despite being largely sedentary, some southward movement may occur in winter among individuals in the eastern part of the range.

This species prefers dense, mature forest habitat with a closed canopy in lowland and foothill areas. Spruce forests are preferred for foraging and nesting habitat because spruce's denser foliage provides better concealment from predators than that of other local conifers. High breeding success has been linked to high foliage density, as this provides better hiding places for eggs and nestlings, making them less likely to attract predators. Additionally, the benefit of increased predator evasion through more hiding space would probably outweigh the cost of making predators more difficult to see by the jays within the dense foliage. The Siberian jay is notably selective in its choice of territory, with a typical territory comprising old dense spruce swamp with ample vegetation cover. Territories also tend to be structurally diverse, comprising scrub of various ages, groves and flood meadows. Therefore, active territories can be considered an indicator of a forest's high ecological diversity.

== Behaviour and ecology ==
The species has a complex and unusual social structure. Siberian jays live in small flocks of 2–7 individuals, with the dominant breeding pair at the centre of the group; alongside retained multigenerational offspring and unrelated immigrants. Within a group, there is a dominance hierarchy; whereby males are dominant over females and breeders are dominant over non-breeders; with some male non-breeders being dominant over female breeders. The composition of the flocks varies. Some comprise only family members and families associated with non-related immigrants. Others contain only nonrelated individuals. Immigrants that are unrelated to the existing population can be tolerated within the territory outside nesting areas.

Siberian jays are aggressive towards unrelated intruders on their territory. Two different aggressive responses have been observed in territory holders within feeding grounds: (1) the intruder is approached and forced away; or (2) the intruder is chased while in flight. However, the latter behaviour is more costly to the aggressor. Although breeders are considerably more aggressive toward immigrants than retained offspring, aggressive responses appear to be modified by social dominance within groups. For example, females have been found to receive significantly more aggression than males because males show more resistance on account of their higher social ranking, therefore resulting in a higher energy cost on the part of the aggressor. Siberian jays also appear to recognise their own young through associative learning as opposed to genetic cues, as shown by experiments in which Siberian jays did not differentiate between own and fostered offspring.

=== Breeding ===
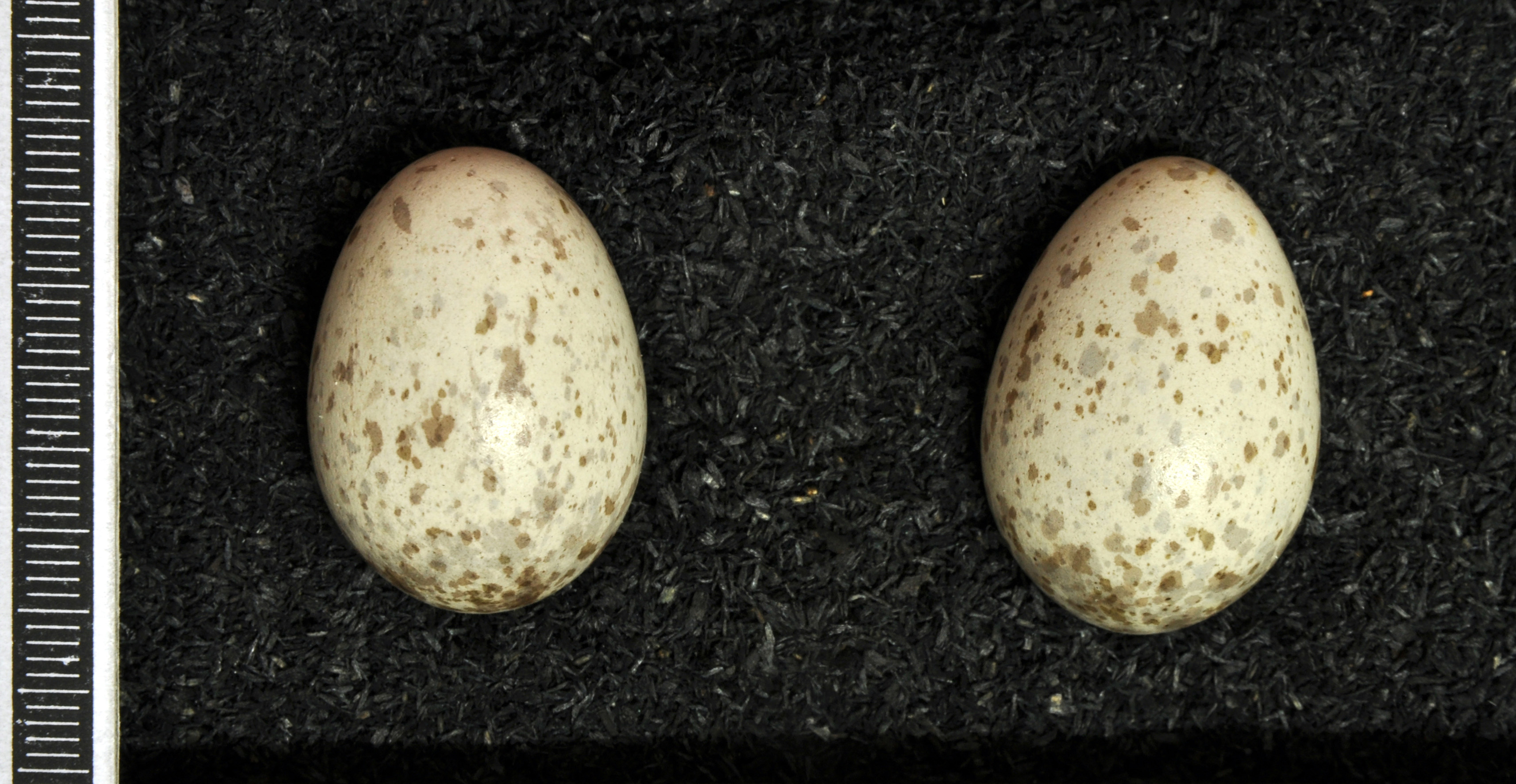
Eggs in the Museum Wiesbaden

Siberian Jays are strictly monogamous, with an established pair staying together and holding the same territory for life. Mate guarding in both sexes has been observed, whereby males and females become increasingly aggressive toward same-sex conspecifics. This may prevent extra-pair mating opportunities for the partner and thereby preserve inclusive fitness for both pair members. The size of the territory is 1 to 4 km^{2} (0.39 to 1.54 sq mi), which is slightly enlarged in autumn and winter. Although territories are firmly established, the jays can move to a neighbouring site if this is a better quality habitat where breeding success will be higher. Widowed individuals have been observed to establish new pair bonds.

The nest is situated in a pine or spruce tree 4–6 m (13–20 ft) above ground within dense foliage for optimal concealment from nest predators. The nest comprises a loose cup of dry twigs broken off trees by the jays and is thickly lined with beard lichen moss, down feathers, cobwebs, reindeer fur and wasp nest fragments; which serves as necessary insulation against the extreme winter cold. Nest material is hoarded in winter long before building takes place. Nest building proper begins in late March and lasts for about three weeks. Both partners collect nest material; but only the female builds the nest.

The eggs are pale green, blue or grey and spotted with grey and brown. The average size is 31.6 mm × 22.9 mm (1.24 in × 0.90 in). They are laid 31 March – 22 April, with a variable clutch size of 1–5 and an incubation period of about 19 days. The eggs are incubated entirely by the female, whilst the male provides all the food for the brooding female and the chicks. The Siberian jay is single brooded and does not relay in a breeding season even after nest failure, but will wait until next year. A new nest is also built for every breeding attempt. Newly hatched young are almost bare and are closely covered by the female. Juveniles look similar to adults, but have paler heads.

A high proportion of the young's diet comprises insect larvae, which the male collects and stored in his oesophagus until he returns to the nest to regurgitate it and feed it to the young. In the first week of brooding, the male provides all the food for the female and young, but the female takes an increasing share of the work thereafter.

The young fledge in mid-May to early June and leave the nest around this time, 18–24 days after the first chick has hatched; although they usually hide within tree branches on the territory until they are able to properly fly. Parents continue to feed the young for about three weeks after fledging, with all of them remaining in a family group throughout summer, autumn and winter. Most mature young disperse from the natal territory in their first summer 4–8 weeks after fledging to join new groups which are usually situated more than four territories away from the natal one. These early dispersers are generally subordinates which have been out-competed and displaced by one or a few socially dominant offspring that are retained. If offspring have not yet dispersed by the time they are eight weeks old, they usually remain in the natal territory at least through the first winter. The retained, socially dominant offspring remaining on the natal territory may wait for up to five years before dispersing, whenever a suitable breeding opportunity arises. Retained offspring can also claim their natal territory, but this happens only in the rare event that both parents disappear from the territory within a relatively short time. Offspring may inherit the new territory to which they disperse and at which they breed. However, if there are no vacant territories to occupy, juveniles can join a different family group to gain feeding advantages and may even attempt to establish their own territory at the age of 2–3 years.

Retention of some offspring in the natal territory after fledging is probably best explained by the nepotism (favoritism granted by individuals to related individuals of the same species) which parents show towards them. Parents provide retained offspring with reliable access to resources and antipredator protection, thereby imparting to them a survival advantage (in turn with an inclusive fitness advantage to the parents). Although delayed dispersal of offspring may be explained by "queueing" for available high-quality territories for the offspring to occupy, the influence of nepotism has been shown experimentally. In removal experiments in which a father alpha male in a group was replaced with a new male unrelated to the offspring, the offspring were more likely to disperse prematurely; probably because the new male did not impart the same nepotistic advantages to the now unrelated young. Although retained offspring may incur an initial cost of postponing breeding, this may be offset by enhanced breeding success later in life as a result of resource advantages gained from nepotistic parents; and late dispersers have been found to have higher lifetime reproductive success than early dispersers.

At least one offspring usually remains with the parents after successful reproduction and regularly accompanies the pair for at least a year before dispersing; although some retained offspring may delay their dispersal for up to five years. These are the dominant offspring which out-compete and expel their subordinate siblings. The dispersed subordinate individuals (which disperse in their first summer) settle as non-breeding immigrants in other existing flocks and tend to disperse much further than their dominant siblings, which more often move straight into a breeding position in a new territory. Unusually for a gregarious corvid species, members in a group of Siberian jays do not help the parents raise younger siblings in future cohorts (i.e., there is no cooperative breeding) and so offspring retention is not explained by cooperative breeding. Groups also stay together outside the breeding season, which is another unusual phenomenon.

=== Feeding ===
The Siberian Jay is omnivorous, feeding mainly on berries, seeds, insects and spiders. Flocks will also feed on large carcasses killed by mammalian predators such as wolves and wolverines. Other occasional food items include eggs of small birds, tit nestlings, snails, slugs, small mammals and lizards. In autumn and winter, berries (especially bilberries and cowberries) are typically collected and stored behind loose bark or in hanging beard lichen and between forked twigs. Siberian jays distribute many different hidden food caches over a large area and are therefore known as scatter hoarders. However, unlike in other corvids, this hidden food stash is not purposefully shared with siblings to increase inclusive fitness but is consumed by the hoarder or a pilferer for selfish use. These food caches are critical to this species' winter survival since foraging time is greatly restricted by the few hours of daylight. To securely store food, Siberian jays have developed special saliva glands which they use to form sticky food clumps which they can adhere to beard moss or holes in tree bark where they are readily accessible throughout the winter. Because of their reliance on food stores during winter, these birds are territorial and hold food reserves scattered around the territory, especially near to the nest.

When foraging, Siberian jays often stay within the closed-canopy forest to avoid visual detection by predators, although they may occasionally forage for insects in wet, tussock-strewn open areas. They forage in flocks comprising 3–5 individuals within their large territory. Especially in winter, Siberian jays will also venture into increasingly open areas to take and store small rodents for food when the latter are abundant.

== Threats ==
Birds of prey, especially hawks such the goshawk and sparrowhawk, are the main predators of Siberian jays. Most Siberian jay predators detect prey visually, so that the combination of ample forest foliage cover with the jays' cryptic colouration and secretive nesting helps render the jays inconspicuous to potential predators. Predators of this species' eggs and young include squirrels, ravens, hooded crows, magpies and Eurasian jays. The nest is constructed within the dense foliage to avoid attracting the attention of predators. Females also appear to lay smaller clutches under higher predation pressure, which may help to avoid attracting predator attention to the nest since fewer visits to the nest by the parent are necessary. Further, in higher cover nests, chicks are fed by the parent more evenly than in exposed nests more detectable by predators; so that chicks raised in well-concealed nests are expected to have better growth.

The European expanse of the population is threatened by habitat degradation through the encroachments of forestry, road building, settlements and agriculture. Modern European forestry practices in particular may be lessening the quality of breeding habitats for the Siberian jay by depriving the birds of sufficient foliage cover. This may occur through forest thinning, whereby lower-quality trees are regularly removed from forest stands. Excessive clearcutting has been linked with increased territory abandonment by Siberian jays, leading to strong decreases in the species' breeding success in affected areas. Another practice which may threaten the Siberian jay has been the large-scale removal of stands of native spruce to be replaced with pine, potentially leading to loss of sufficient visual cover of nesting activity from predators with removal of spruce. In Finland, spruce has also been declining faster than other forest types and loss and fragmentation of spruce forests through forestry has been linked with population declines here. Anthropogenic habitat loss may be interacting with natural threats from predators. The Siberian jay population has declined more than can be explained by anthropogenic forest clearance alone, which may be attributable to increased nest exposure to avian predators and other human activities favouring these predatory species. Human activity may also favour nest predators such as Eurasian jays through supplemental feeding and refuse dumpling, thereby compounding the predation pressure on Siberian jays through visual exposure to predators. Finally, destruction by felling of winter food storages in trees near territories during winter may also destroy winter food caches.

Alongside increased predator attention, the open land exposed as a result of forest habitat fragmentation also presents an apparently large dispersal barrier which the jays may find difficult to cross given their apparent cumbersomeness at traversing open land. Siberian jays also appear unable to evolve fast enough to adapt to these anthropogenic habitat and predator population changes. Because of this species' sedentary habit, there appear to be several genetically isolated subpopulations. Given this jay's high site fidelity, gene flow between subpopulations may have been low even before onset of modern forestry practices which have created the strong dispersal barriers.

== In culture and relationship with humans ==
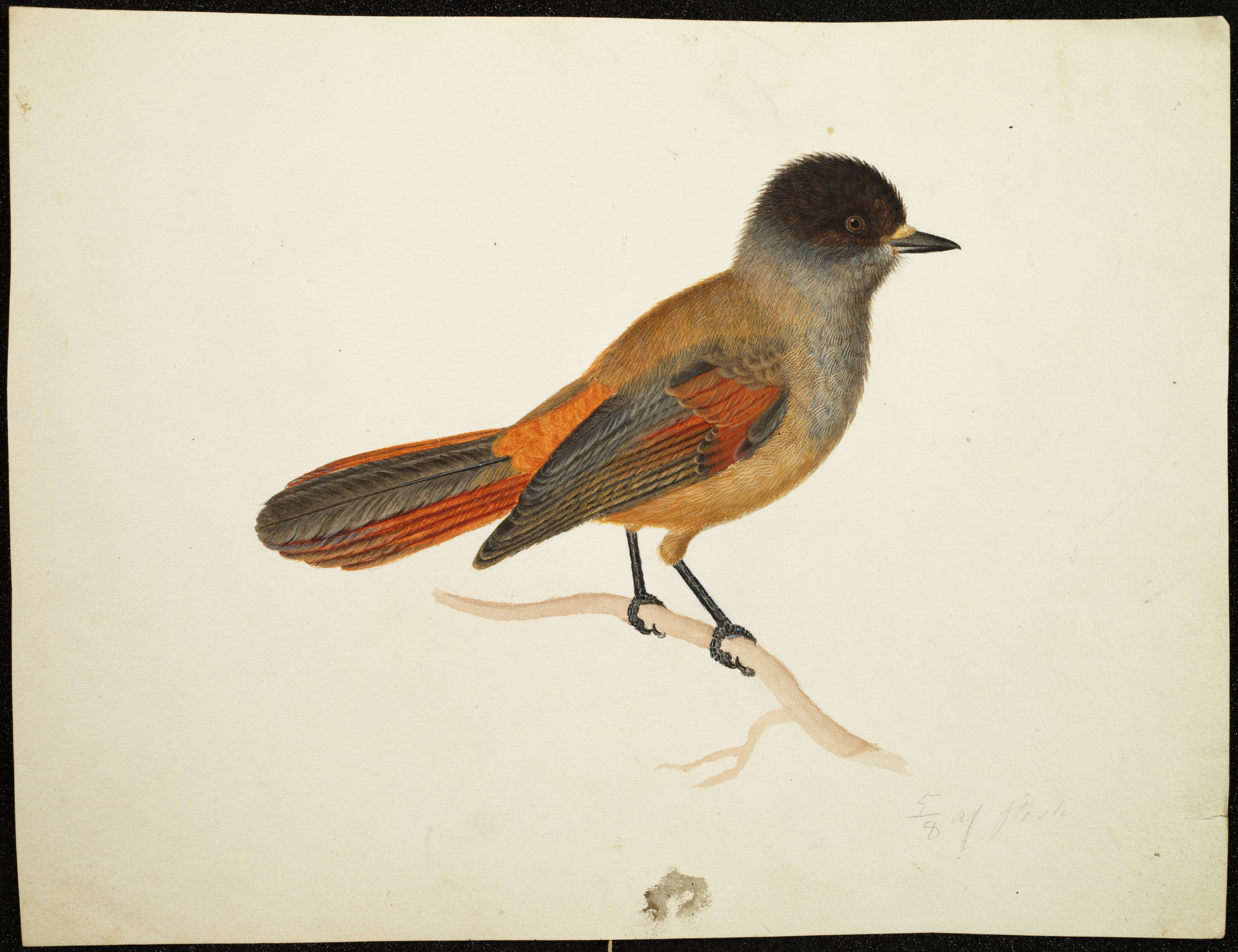
Preparatory drawing of a Siberian jay by Magnus Körner for Illuminerade figurer till Skandinaviens fauna by Sven Nilsson (1840)

Siberian jays are reported to be fearless in human company, and, with repeated provision of food by humans in the same place, may become tame enough to take food from the hand. This was especially the case when forestry workers used to regularly leave patches of food scraps in the forest or around campfires for the jays to take. The Siberian jay has now gained flagship status as a conservation concern both because of threats from modern forestry and because active territories are considered a sign of high-quality biodiverse forest.

== Status ==
The Siberian jay is evaluated as Least Concern by the IUCN because of the species' exceptionally large range. Although the world population is declining, the magnitude of this drop is not deemed to be sufficiently large to render the species Vulnerable. The world population is very large and estimated at 4–8 million mature individuals. Population declines have been reported to be strongest in the southernmost part of the range.
