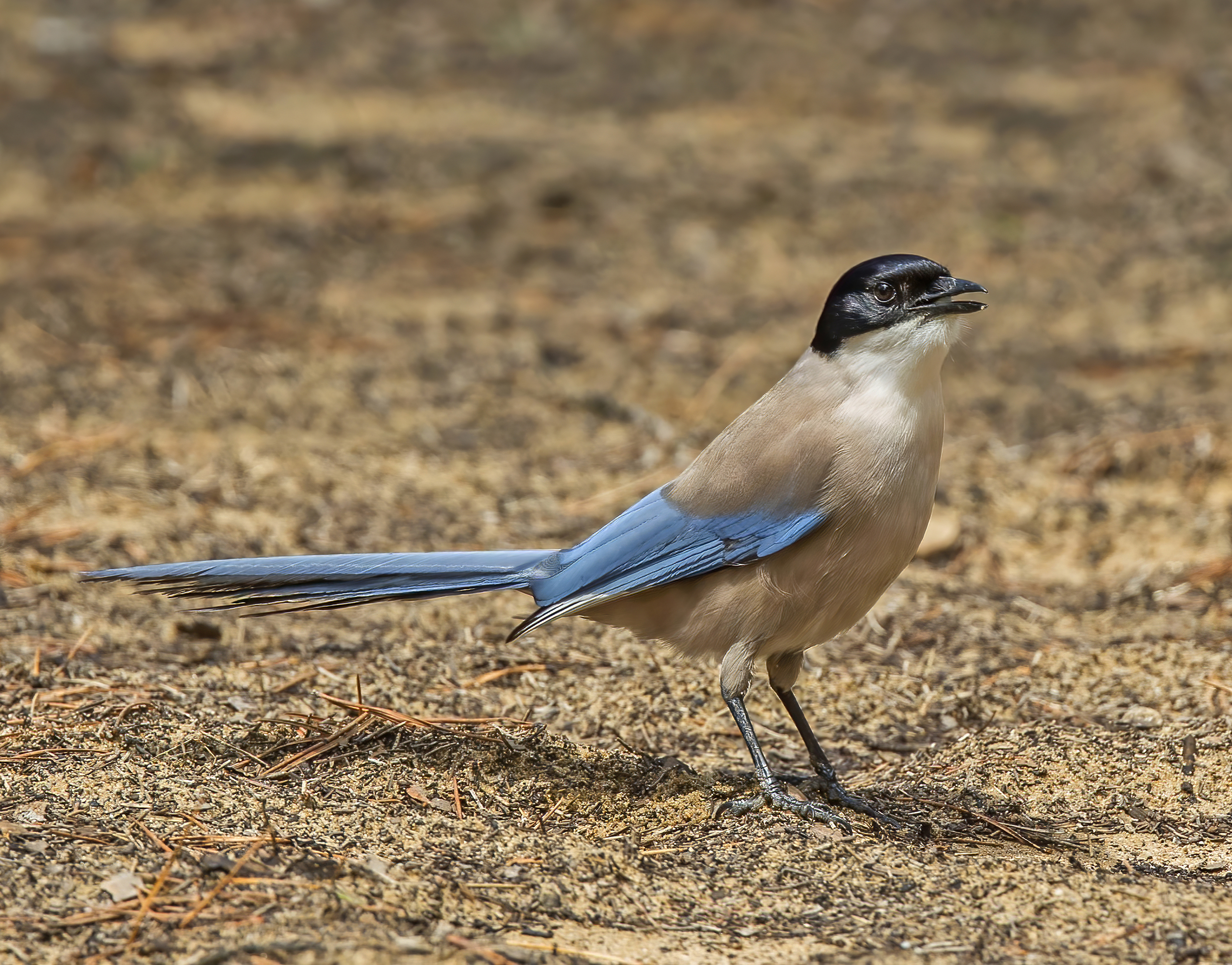
- In Almonte, Spain

Conservation status
- Least Concern (IUCN 3.1)

Scientific classification
- Kingdom: Animalia
- Phylum: Chordata
- Class: Aves
- Order: Passeriformes
- Family: Corvidae
- Genus: Cyanopica
- Species: C. cooki

Binomial name
- Cyanopica cooki Bonaparte, 1850
- Range of Cyanopica cooki

Synonyms
- Cyanopica cyana cooki Cyanopica cyanus cooki

= Iberian magpie =

Bird in the crow family

The Iberian magpie (Cyanopica cooki) is a bird in the crow family. It is 31–35 cm (12–14 in) long and similar in overall shape to the Eurasian magpie (Pica pica) but is slenderer with proportionately smaller legs and bill.

== Taxonomy ==
The Iberian magpie was formally described in 1850 by the French naturalist Charles Lucien Bonaparte based on a specimen that had been collected by Samuel Edward Cook in Spain. Bonaparte coined the binomial name Cyanopica cooki, to replace the preoccupied Pica cyanea. The specific epithet was chosen to honour the collector. The type locality was restricted to Madrid by Harry Forbes Witherby in 1923. The species is monotypic: no subspecies are recognised.

This taxon was formerly treated as conspecific with the azure-winged magpie (C. cyanus), but this population is 5,400 miles (9,000 km) away from those in eastern Asia. Genetic analysis has suggested that Iberian and azure-winged magpies are distinct species. Other common names include Iberian azure-winged magpie, Cook's azure-winged magpie, and Spanish azure-winged magpie.

== Description ==
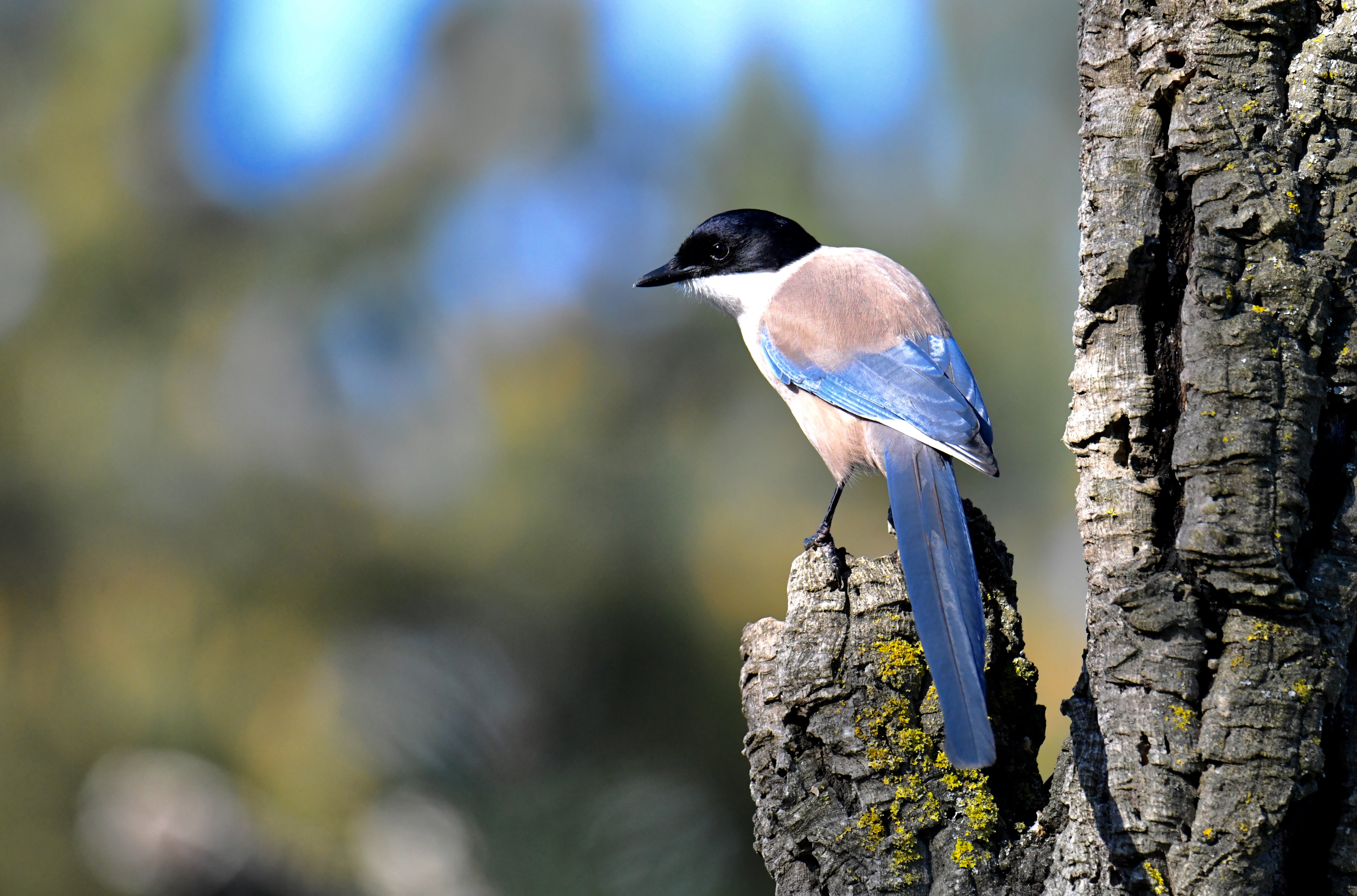
Adult in Salvaterra de Magos, Santarém, Portugal

It has a glossy black top to the head and a white throat. The underparts and the back are a light grey-fawn in colour with the wings and the feathers of the long (16–20 cm) tail an azure blue.

== Distribution and habitat ==
The Iberian magpie occurs in southwestern and central parts of the Iberian Peninsula, in Spain and Portugal. However, it can sometimes be spotted also in south-western France, and recently its presence has been reported even in north-western Italy. It inhabits various types of coniferous (mainly pine) and broadleaf forest, including parks and gardens in the eastern populations.

== Behaviour and ecology ==
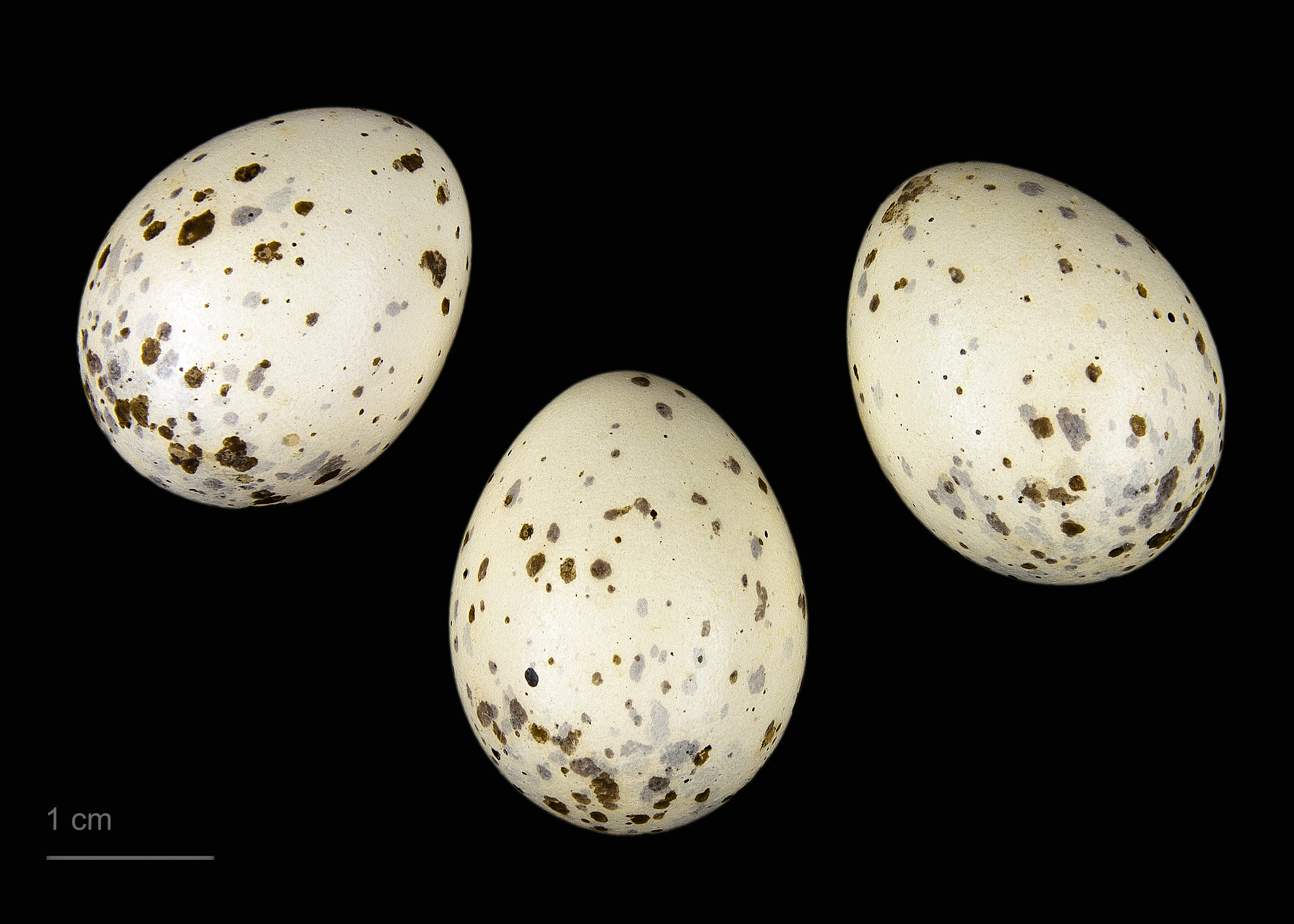
Cyanopica cooki - MHNT

Often Iberian magpies find food as a family group or several groups making flocks of up to 70 birds. The largest groups congregate after the breeding season and throughout the winter months. Their diet consists mainly of acorns (oak seeds) and pine nuts, extensively supplemented by invertebrates and their larvae, soft fruits and berries, and also human-provided scraps in parks and towns.

This species usually nests in loose, open colonies with a single nest in each tree, same mean clutch size is 6.2 eggs, but only 32% of nesting attempts are successful, with an average 5.1 young fledged.
