= Azure-winged magpie =

- In Zhengzhou, China

Conservation status
- Least Concern (IUCN 3.1)

Scientific classification
- Kingdom: Animalia
- Phylum: Chordata
- Class: Aves
- Order: Passeriformes
- Family: Corvidae
- Genus: Cyanopica
- Species: C. cyanus

Binomial name
- Cyanopica cyanus (Pallas, 1776)
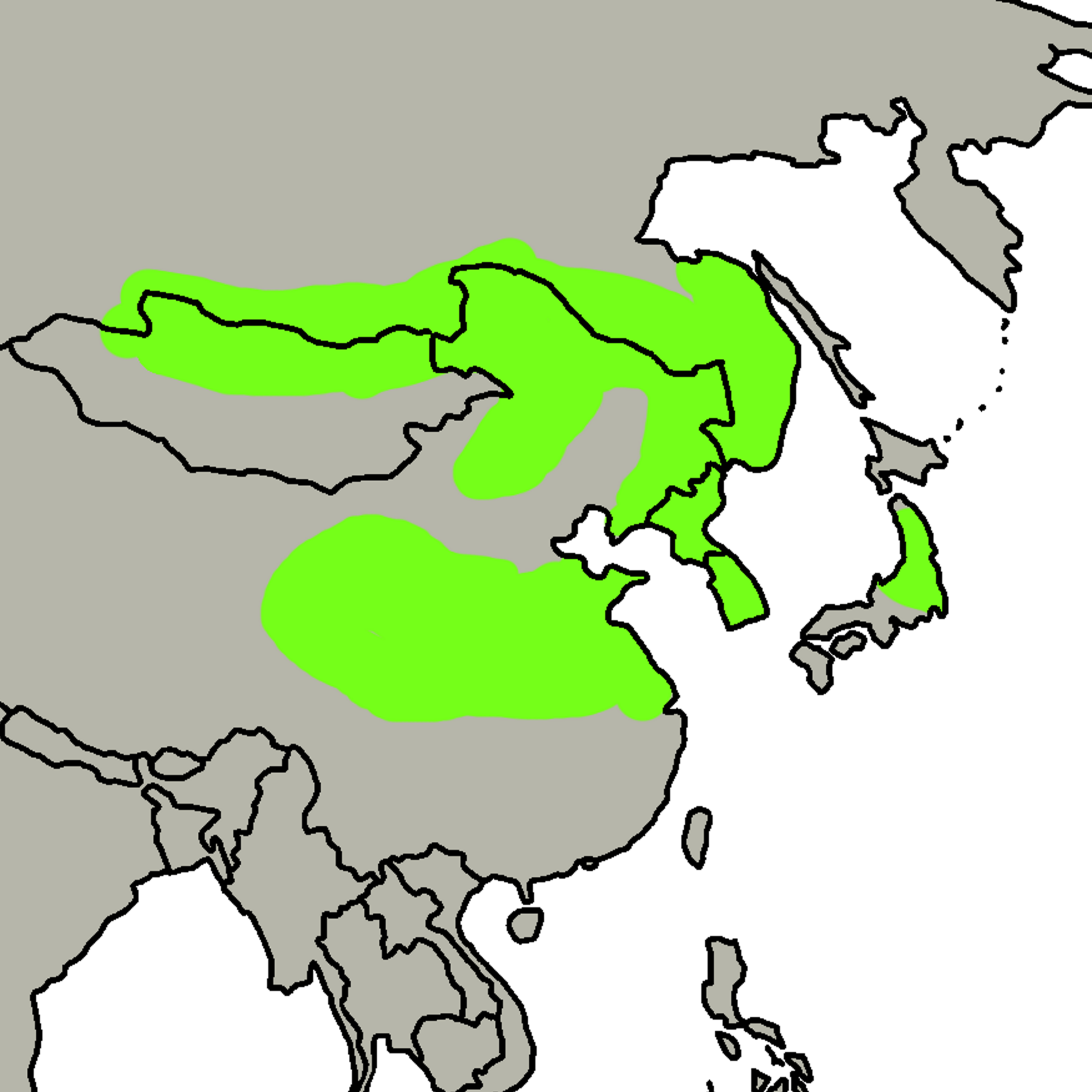

Synonyms
- Cyanopica cyana

Species of bird

The azure-winged magpie (Cyanopica cyanus) is a bird in the crow family. It is 31–35 cm long and similar in overall shape to the Eurasian magpie (Pica pica) but is more slender with proportionately smaller legs and bill. It has a glossy black top to the head and a white throat. The underparts and the back are a light grey-fawn in colour with the wings and the feathers of the long (16–20 cm) tail an azure blue. It inhabits various types of coniferous (mainly pine) and broadleaf forest, including parks and gardens in the eastern populations.

== Distribution and habitat ==
It occurs over a large region of eastern Asia in China, Korea, Japan, and north into Mongolia and southern Siberia. The Iberian magpie from southwestern and central parts of the Iberian Peninsula, in Spain and Portugal was formerly thought to be conspecific, but recent genetic analysis has shown them to be distinct at species level, the white-tipped tail being a prominent indicator.

== Behaviour and ecology ==
Often azure-winged magpies find food as a family group or several groups making flocks of up to 70 birds. The largest groups congregate after the breeding season and throughout the winter months. Their diet consists mainly of acorns (oak seeds) and pine nuts, extensively supplemented by invertebrates and their larvae, soft fruits and berries, and also human-provided scraps in parks and towns.

This species usually nests in loose, open colonies with a single nest in each tree. There are usually 6–8 eggs that are incubated for 15 days. Azure-winged magpies that have asynchronous broods, creating a size hierarchy among nestlings, produce more eggs and fledge more nestlings than those which have synchronous broods.

The voice is a quick fired and metallic sounding kwink-kwink-kwink usually preceded by a single krarrah.

== Gallery ==
Azure-winged magpie in Tokyo

In Badaguan, Qingdao, Shandong, China

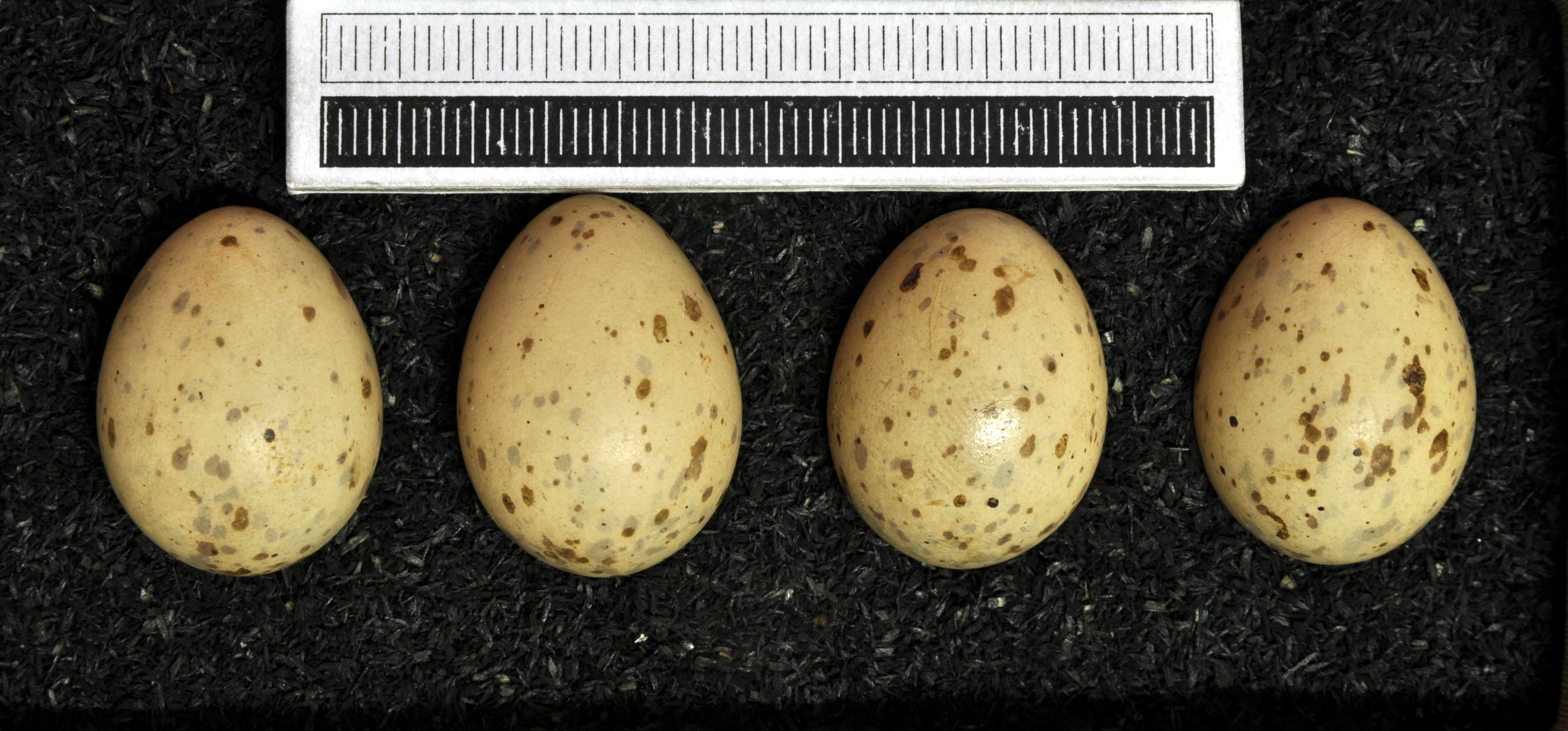
Eggs, Collection Museum Wiesbaden
