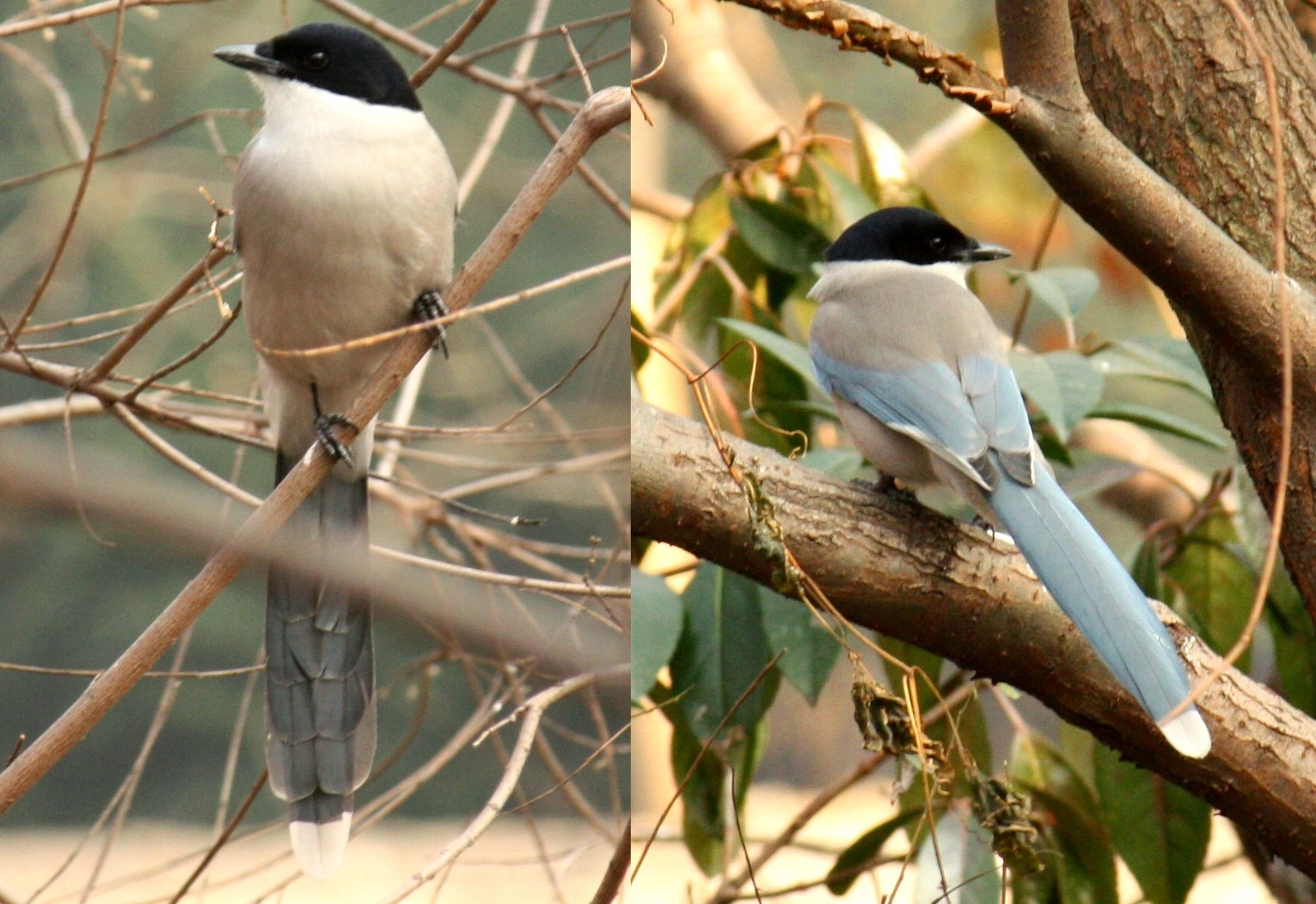
- Azure-winged magpie, Cyanopica cyanus

Scientific classification
- Kingdom: Animalia
- Phylum: Chordata
- Class: Aves
- Order: Passeriformes
- Family: Corvidae
- Subfamily: Perisoreinae
- Genus: Cyanopica; Bonaparte, 1850

Type species
- Corvus cyanus Pallas, 1766

Species
- Cyanopica cyanus; Cyanopica cooki

= Cyanopica =

Genus of birds

Cyanopica is a small genus of magpies in the family Corvidae. They belong to a common lineage with the genus Perisoreus.

The genus Cyanopica was introduced in 1850 by the French naturalist Charles Lucien Bonaparte. The type species was designated by George Gray in 1855 as Corvus cyanus Pallas, 1766, the azure-winged magpie. The generic name is derived from the Latin words cyanos, meaning "lapis lazuli", and pica, meaning "magpie".

== Species ==
The genus contains two species:

Image	Scientific name	Common name	Distribution
	Cyanopica cyanus	Azure-winged magpie	eastern Asia in most of China, Korea, Japan, and north into Mongolia and southern Siberia
	Cyanopica cooki	Iberian magpie	southwestern and central parts of the Iberian Peninsula, in Spain and Portugal
