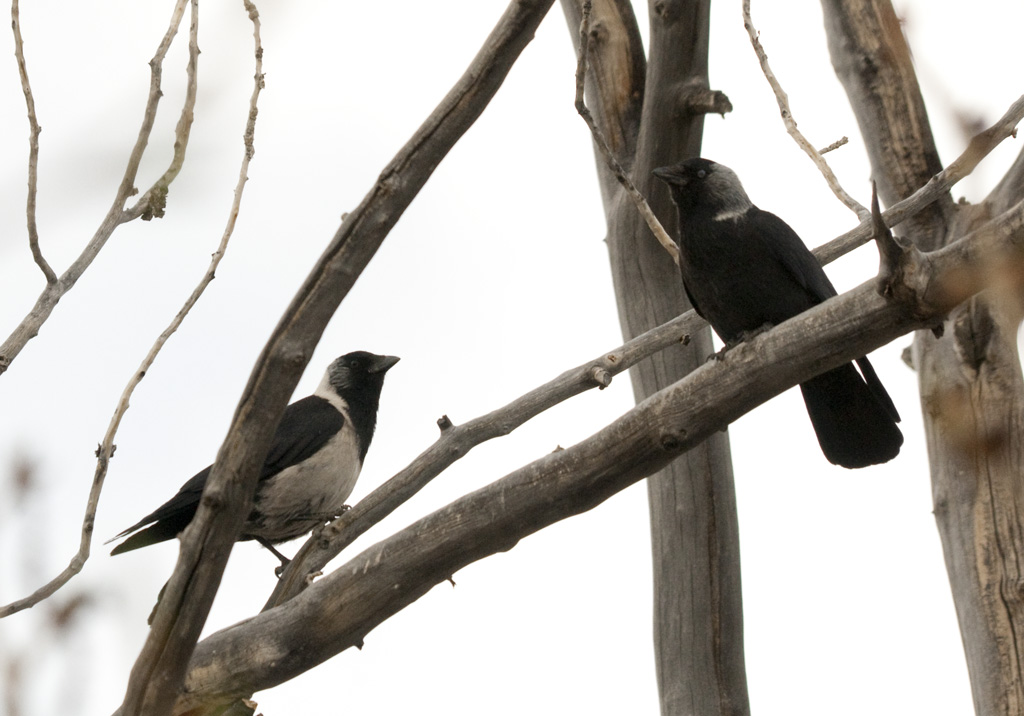
- Left to right: Daurian jackdaw (Coloeus dauuricus) and western jackdaw (C. monedula)

Scientific classification
- Kingdom: Animalia
- Phylum: Chordata
- Class: Aves
- Order: Passeriformes
- Family: Corvidae
- Subfamily: Corvinae
- Genus: Coloeus; Kaup, 1829

Species
- C. dauuricus; C. monedula

= Jackdaw =

Two species of bird

Jackdaws are two species of bird in the genus Coloeus closely related to, but generally smaller than, crows and ravens (Corvus). They have a blackish crown, wings, and tail, with the rest of their plumage paler. The word Coloeus is Neo-Latin, from the Ancient Greek for jackdaws: koloiós (κολοιός). They come from Asia, Europe, Africa, and Siberia.

== Taxonomy ==
While some authors consider Coloeus a subgenus of Corvus, others have classified Coloeus as a distinct genus in the family Corvidae. Following Birds of South Asia: The Ripley Guide, the International Ornithological Congress has also reassigned the two jackdaw species from the genus Corvus to the genus Coloeus.

=== Species ===
Genus Coloeus – Kaup, 1829 – two species
Common name	Scientific name and subspecies	Range	Size and ecology	IUCN status and estimated population
western jackdaw	Coloeus monedula (Linnaeus, 1758)	breeds in Europe, northern Asia and Northern Africa	Size: Habitat: Diet:	LC
Daurian jackdaw	Coloeus dauuricus (Pallas, 1776)	from China and eastern Siberia to Japan	Size: Habitat: Diet:	LC

The eastern species is smaller than the western, and in eastern adults, the pale areas of the plumage are almost white, whereas in the western bird, these areas are pale grey. The iris is pale in western jackdaw and dark in Daurian jackdaw. The two species are otherwise very similar in shape, calls, and behaviour. An argument has been made for lumping the two as one species, but they do not interbreed where their ranges meet in Mongolia.

== In Popular Culture ==
In Assassin's Creed: Black Flag, Edward Kenway's ship is called Jackdaw.
