= Boris K. Stegmann =

Russian ornithologist (1898–1975)

Boris Karlovich Stegmann Борис Карлович Штегман
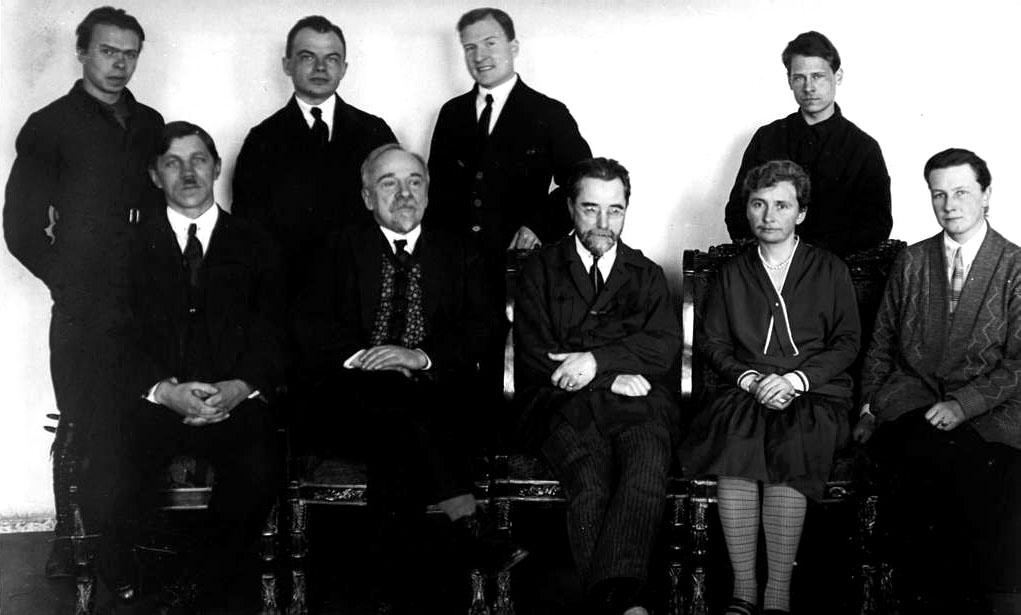
- Stegmann, standing third from left in 1924
- Born: 25 December 1898; Pskov, Russia
- Died: 28 December 1975 (aged 77); Leningrad
- Other name: Boris Karlovich Shtegmann
- Known for: Faunal affinities or "faunal types" to subdivide the palearctic region
- Spouse: Tatiana Savelyeva
- Scientific career
- Fields: Ornithology
- Workplaces: Russian Academy of Sciences

Boris Karlovich Stegmann (or Shtegmann) (Russian: Борис Карлович Штегман: 25 December 1898 – 28 December 1975) was a Russian ornithologist of German descent who worked on zoogeography and introduced the idea of faunal affinities or "faunal types" to subdivide the palearctic region. An influential comparative anatomy of the avian forelimb was published posthumously.

== Biography ==
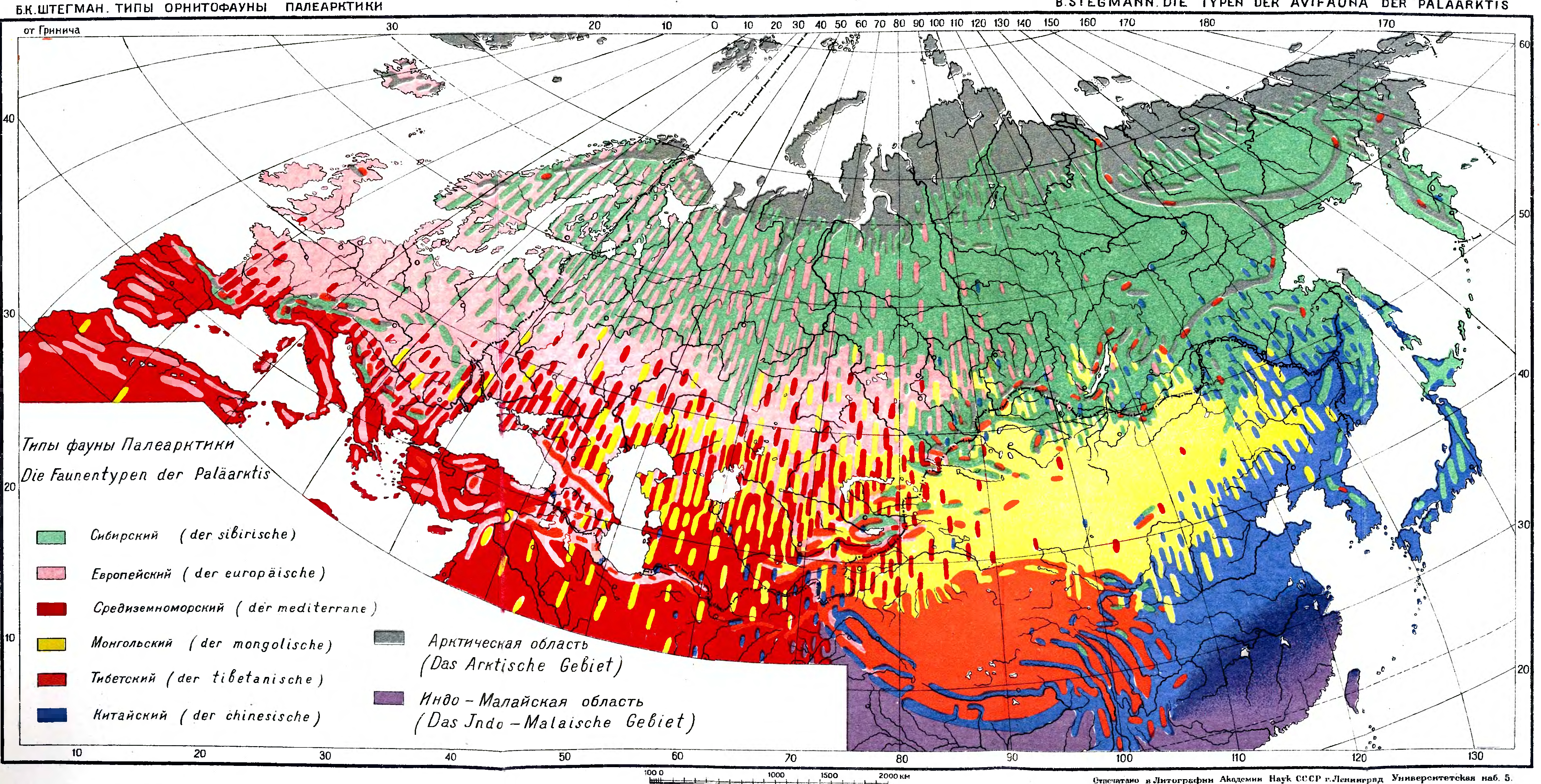
Stegmann's subdivision of the Palearctic based on faunal affinities

Stegmann was born in Pskov, Russia. He worked at the Russian Academy of Sciences from 1921 in the ornithology department. He became a research assistant in 1928 and worked on various bird groups. In 1938 he published his ideas on nine avifaunal centres within the Old World. This was an influential work in its time. In 1938 his German ancestry led to his arrest but he was released after a year and a half. But after the beginning of World War II he was expelled from Leningrad and forced to work in Kazakhstan. Exiled along with his wife Tatiana Savelyeva in the Balkash region of central Asia, he continued his research on birds in the region until 1954. In 1964 he published a volume on the birds of the Soviet Union along with Aleksandr Ivanovich Ivanov. He also worked on molluscs and on the evolution of birds. He published a key to the bird families of the Soviet Union and took a special interest in the corvids. In 1978 a manuscript on the comparative anatomy of the avian forelimb was published posthumously with a preface by Walter Bock.

In 1951 he wrote a biographical memoir which was briefly printed but destroyed by political censors. A copy was rediscovered and republished in 2004. Several subspecies of bird including Charadrius mongolus stegmanni, Tetrao urogalloides stegmanni, Passer montanus stegmanni, Falco tinnunculus stegmanni, Cyanopica cyanus stegmanni and Phragmaticola aёdon stegmanni have been named after him.
