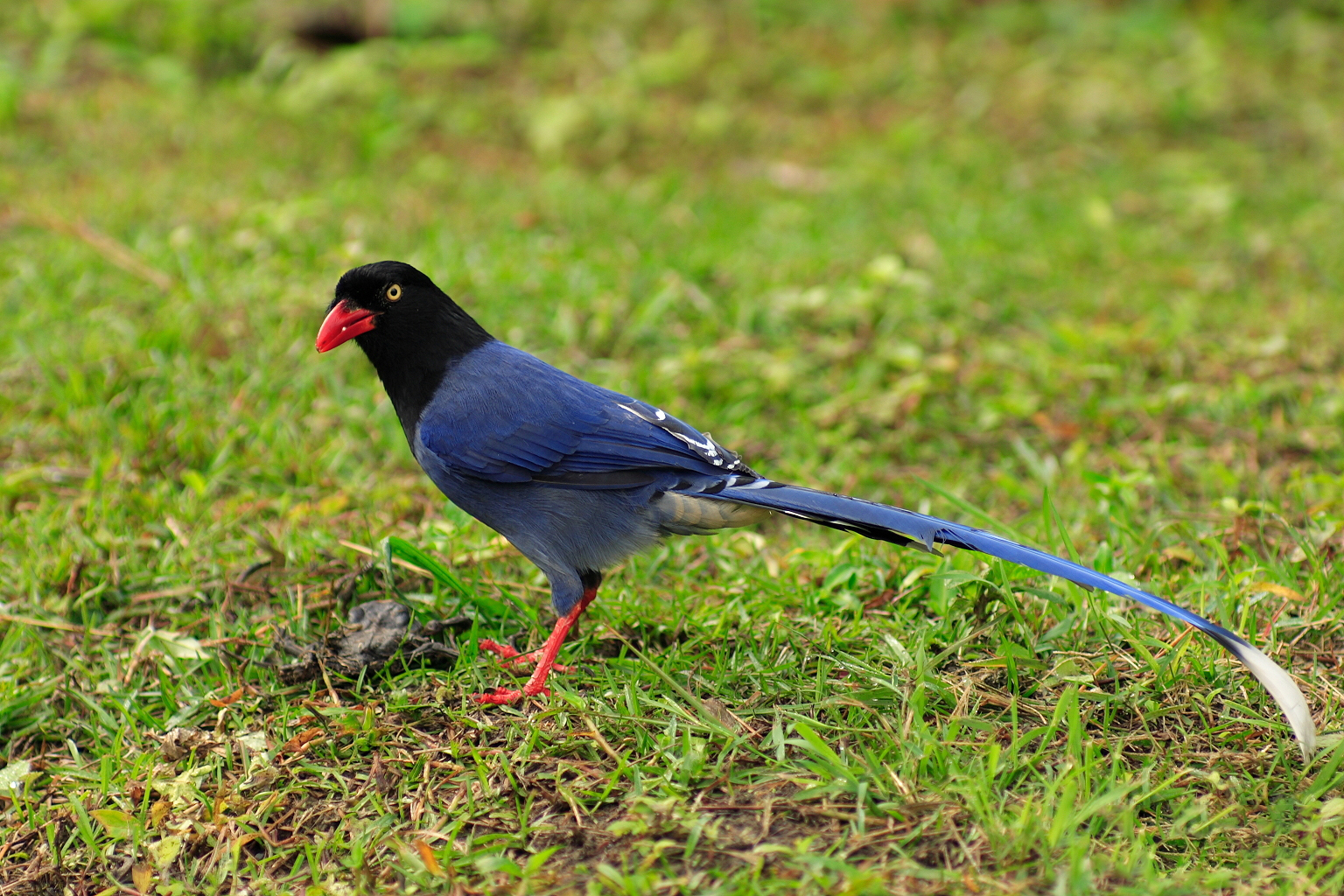
- The taiwan blue magpie

Scientific classification
- Kingdom: Animalia
- Phylum: Chordata
- Class: Aves
- Order: Passeriformes
- Family: Corvidae
- Subfamily: Cissinae; Kaup, 1855

Type genus
- Cissa F. Boie, 1826

Genera
- Urocissa; Cissa

= Cissinae =

Subfamily of birds

Cissinae is one of six subfamilies in the crow family (Corvidae). It comprises 9 species, which are spread over two genera. The members of Cissinae as a whole are sometimes referred to as blue/green magpies, and are described as some of the most colourful members of the Corvidae family.

== Description ==
Species in Cissinae are brightly-coloured magpies; blue or green, generally blue in Urocissa and green in Cissa, although members of Cissa have been observed to appear more blue or turquoise in captivity.

== Distribution and habitat ==
Members of Cissinae are found across tropical South and Southeast Asia.

== Taxonomy ==
Genus	Species	Image of type species	Range
Urocissa Cabanis, 1850	Taiwan blue magpie (U. caerulea) (Gould, 1863); Red-billed blue magpie (U. erythroryncha) (Boddaert, 1783); Yellow-billed blue magpie (U. flavirostris)(Blyth, 1846); Sri Lanka blue magpie (U. ornata)(Wagler, 1829); White-winged magpie (U. whiteheadi)(Ogilvie-Grant, 1899)		Tropical and subtropical South and Southeast Asia
Cissa Boie, 1826	Common green magpie (C. chinensis) (Boddaert, 1783); Indochinese green magpie (C. hypoleuca) (Salvadori & Giglioli, 1885); Javan green magpie (C. thalassina) (Sharpe, 1888); Bornean green magpie (C. jefferyi) (Temminck, 1826)		Tropical and subtropical Southeast Asia

== Evolutionary history ==
Cissinae is thought to have originated in East Asia and Sundaland, during the Miocene. The birds also dispersed into the Indian subcontinent around the mid-Pliocene, and diversification of Cissinae members occurred afterwards.

- Corvidae
  - - Pyrrhocoracinae
      Pyrrhocorax
  - - - Crypsirininae
        - Dendrocitta
        - - Crypsirina
          - - Temnurus
            - Platysmurus
    - - - Cissinae
          - Urocissa
          - Cissa
      - - - Perisoreinae
            - Perisoreus
            - Cyanopica
        - - Cyanocoracinae
            - - - Cyanocorax
                - - Calocitta
                  - Psilorhinus
              - - Aphelocoma
                - - Cyanocitta
                  - Gymnorhinus
            - Cyanolyca
          - Corvinae
            - - Corvus sensu lato
                - Corvus
                - Coloeus
              - Nucifraga
            - - - Pica
                - Garrulus
              - - - Podoces
                  - Ptilostomus
                - Zavattariornis
- Laniidae
