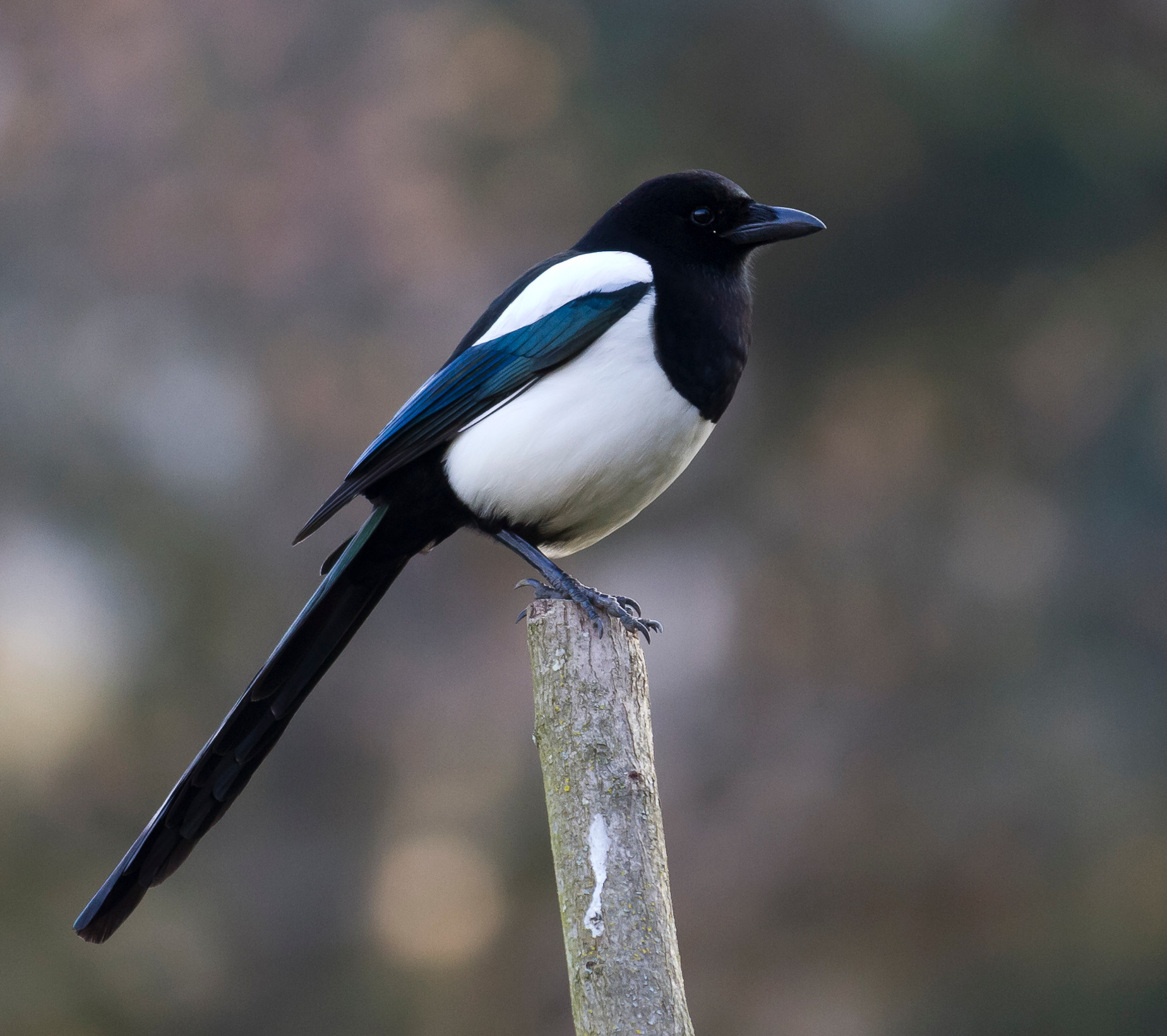
- Eurasian magpie

Scientific classification
- Kingdom: Animalia
- Phylum: Chordata
- Class: Aves
- Order: Passeriformes
- Superfamily: Corvoidea
- Family: Corvidae

Groups included
- Cissinae; Cyanopica; Pica

Cladistically included but traditionally excluded taxa
- Cyanocoracinae; Perisoreus; Garrulus; Ptilostomus; Zavattariornis; Podoces; Nucifraga; Coloeus; Corvus

= Magpie =

Large bird in the corvid family

True magpies are birds of various species of the family Corvidae. Like other members of their family, they are widely considered to be intelligent creatures. The Eurasian magpie, for instance, is thought to rank among the world's most intelligent creatures, and is one of the few nonmammalian species able to recognize itself in a mirror test. Magpies have shown the ability to make and use tools, imitate human speech, grieve, play games, and work in teams. They are particularly well known for their songs and were once popular as cagebirds. In addition to other members of the genus Pica, corvids considered magpies are in the genera Cissa, Urocissa, and Cyanopica.

Magpies of the genus Pica are generally found in temperate regions of Europe, Asia, and western North America, with populations also present in Tibet and high-elevation areas of Kashmir. Magpies of the genus Cyanopica are found in East Asia and the Iberian Peninsula. The birds called magpies in Australia are, however, not closely related to the magpies in the rest of the world, only being part of the same clade (Corvides).

== Etymology ==
The name comes from a combination of "mag" and "pie". "Mag" comes from a shortening of the French name "Margot" or "Margaret", which, in the late 14th century, was used for women who chattered idly; this could refer to the chattering sound magpies make. "Pie" could either originate from piebald, or particoloured, used for the white patches found on magpies, or *(s)peik; an Indo-European word itself derived from pie, meaning sharp or pointed. The term "pica" for the human disorder involving a compulsive desire to eat items that are not food is borrowed from the Latin name of the magpie, pica, for its reputed tendency to feed on miscellaneous things.

== Systematics and species ==
According to some studies, magpies do not form the monophyletic group they are traditionally believed to be; tails have elongated (or shortened) independently in multiple lineages of corvid birds. Among the traditional magpies, two distinct lineages apparently exist. One consists of Holarctic species with black and white colouration, and is probably closely related to crows and Eurasian jays. The other contains several species from South to East Asia with vivid colouration, which is predominantly green or blue. The azure-winged magpie and the Iberian magpie, formerly thought to constitute a single species with a most peculiar distribution, have been shown to be two distinct species, and are classified as the genus Cyanopica.

Other research has cast doubt on the taxonomy of the Pica magpies, since P. hudsonia and P. nuttalli may not be different species, whereas the Korean race of P. pica is genetically very distinct from the other Eurasian (as well as the North American) forms. Either the North American, Korean, and remaining Eurasian forms are accepted as three or four separate species, or else only a single species, Pica pica, exists.

Oriental (blue and green) magpies

- Subfamily Cissinae
  - Genus Urocissa
    - Taiwan blue magpie, Urocissa caerulea
    - Red-billed blue magpie, Urocissa erythroryncha
    - Yellow-billed blue magpie, Urocissa flavirostris
    - White-winged magpie, Urocissa whiteheadi
    - Sri Lanka blue magpie, Urocissa ornata
  - Genus Cissa
    - Common green magpie, Cissa chinensis
    - Indochinese green magpie, Cissa hypoleuca
    - Javan green magpie, Cissa thalassina
    - Bornean green magpie, Cissa jefferyi

Azure-winged magpies

- Genus Cyanopica
  - Azure-winged magpie, Cyanopica cyanus
  - Iberian magpie, Cyanopica cooki

Holarctic (black-and-white) magpies

- Genus Pica
  - Eurasian magpie, Pica pica
  - Black-billed magpie, Pica hudsonia (may be conspecific with P. pica)
  - Yellow-billed magpie, Pica nuttalli (may be conspecific with P. (pica) hudsonia)
  - Asir magpie, Pica asirensis (may be conspecific with P. pica)
  - Maghreb magpie, Pica mauritanica (may be conspecific with P. pica)
  - Oriental magpie, Pica serica (may be conspecific with P. pica)
  - Black-rumped magpie. Pica bottanensis (may be conspecific with P. pica)

== False magpies ==
- The black magpies, Platysmurus, are treepies; they are neither magpies, nor as was long believed, jays. Treepies are a distinct group of corvids externally similar to magpies.
- The Australian magpie, Gymnorhina tibicen, is conspicuously "pied", with black and white plumage reminiscent of an Eurasian magpie. It is a member of the family Artamidae, closely related to butcherbirds and is not a corvid.
- The magpie-robins, members of the genus Copsychus, have a similar "pied" appearance, but they are Old World flycatchers, unrelated to the corvids.

== Human interactions ==
=== Cultural references ===
==== Americas ====
The magpie was named the official bird of the city of Edmonton, Alberta, Canada, in May 2025.

==== Asia ====
In East Asian cultures, the magpie is a very popular bird and is a symbol of good luck and fortune.

The magpie is a common subject in Chinese paintings. It is also often found in traditional Chinese poetry and couplets. In addition, in Chinese folklore, all the magpies of the Qixi Festival every year will fly to the Milky Way and form a bridge, where the separated Cowherd and Weaver Girl will meet. The Milky Way is like a river, and the Cowherd and Weaver Girl refer to the famous α-Aquilae and α-Lyrae of modern Astronomy, respectively. For this reason, the magpie bridge has come to symbolize a relationship between men and women.

Magpies have an important place in the birth myth of Aisin Gioro Bukūri Yongšon, the ancestor of the Qing dynasty.

The magpie is a national bird of Korea and a symbol of its capital Seoul. Although produced in the US, the popular film "KPop Demon Hunters" is based on Korean cultural icons and myths, and as such showcases a character called "Sussie the Magpie," a bird believed to bring good fortune.

Magpies are the National bird of Bangladesh.

==== Europe ====
In European culture, the magpie is reputed to collect shiny objects such as wedding rings and other valuables, a well known example being Rossini's opera La Gazza Ladra (The Thieving Magpie). A 2014 study conducted by Exeter University found that Eurasian magpies express neophobia when presented with unfamiliar objects, and were less likely to approach or interact with the shiny objects—metal screws, foil rings and aluminium foil—used in the experiments. However, magpies are naturally curious like other members of the corvid family, and may collect shiny objects, but do not favour shiny objects over dull ones. In England, magpies were traditionally viewed as omens either of fortune or misfortune, depending upon the number of birds one saw. An English nursery rhyme known as "One for Sorrow" recounts the tradition:

One for sorrow,
Two for joy,
Three for a girl,
Four for a boy,
Five for silver,
Six for gold,
Seven for a secret never to be told.

John Brand was an English antiquarian and Church of England clergyman, who was appointed Secretary to the Society of Antiquaries, in 1784. His book, Observations of Popular Antiquities, (1780), has the first-known record of counting Magpies to predict good or ill-fortune. To see four magpies at once was a sign of death in Hartland, Gloucestershire. Sir Humphry Davy wrote on the subject of good and bad luck in Salmonia: or Days of Fly Fishing in 1828:

For anglers in spring it is always unlucky to see single magpies, but two may be always regarded as a favourable omen; and the reason is, that in cold and stormy weather one magpie alone leaves the nest in search of food, the other remaining sitting upon the eggs or the young ones; but when two go out together, it is only when the weather is warm and mild, and thus favourable for fishing."

In sports, some English teams that wear black and white striped kits are nicknamed "the magpies", such as Newcastle United and Notts County.

=== As pests ===
Magpies are common orchard pests in some regions of the world.

== Gallery ==
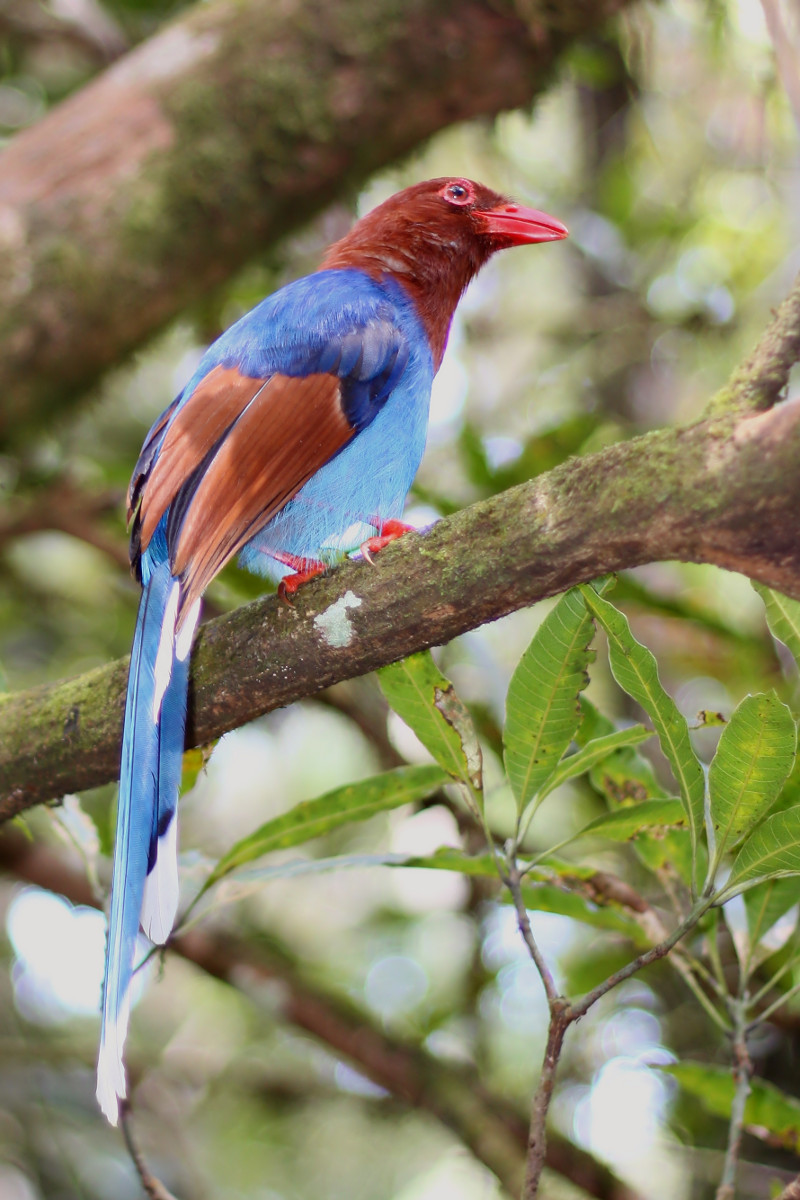
Sri Lanka blue magpie

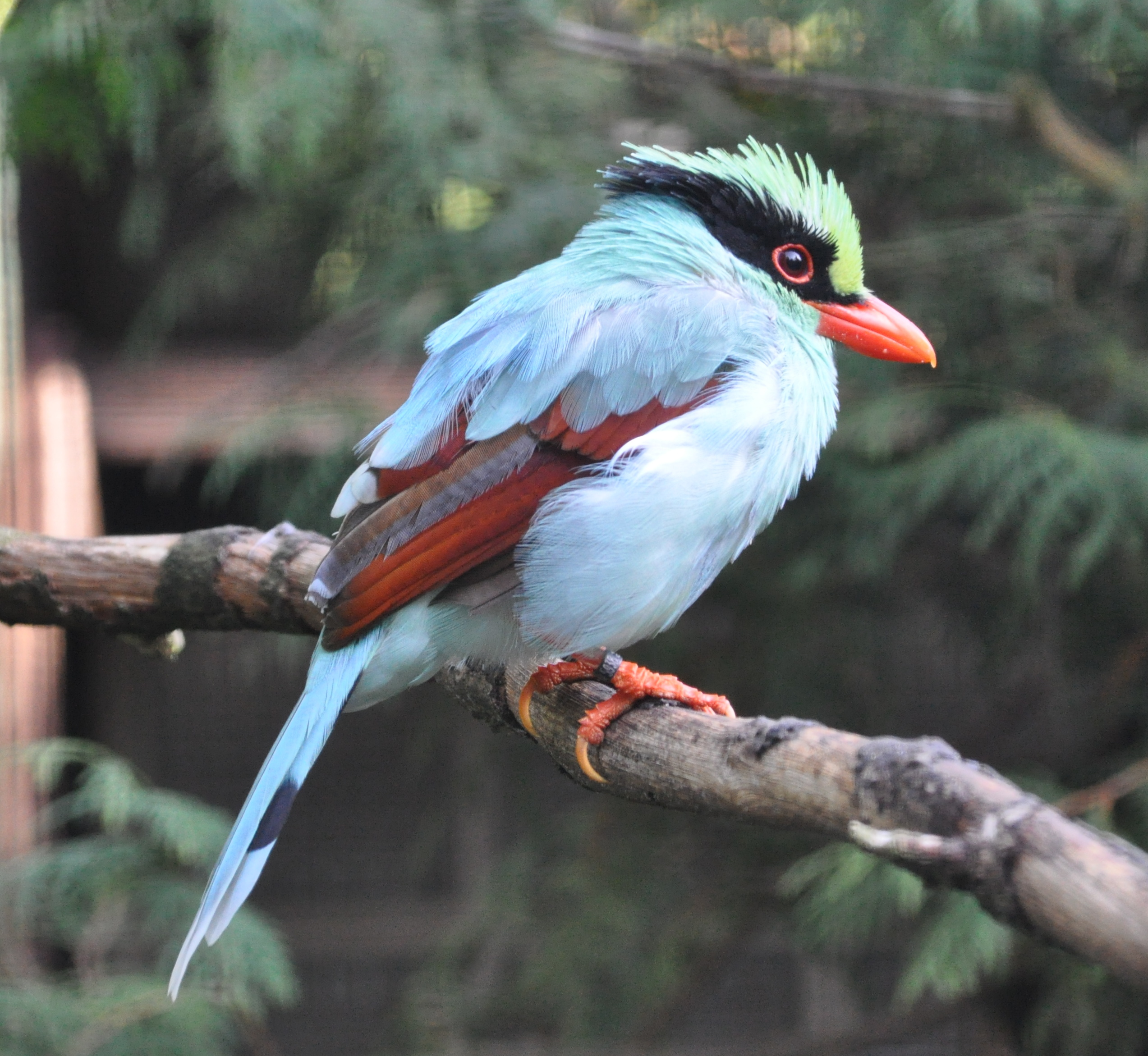
Indochinese green magpie

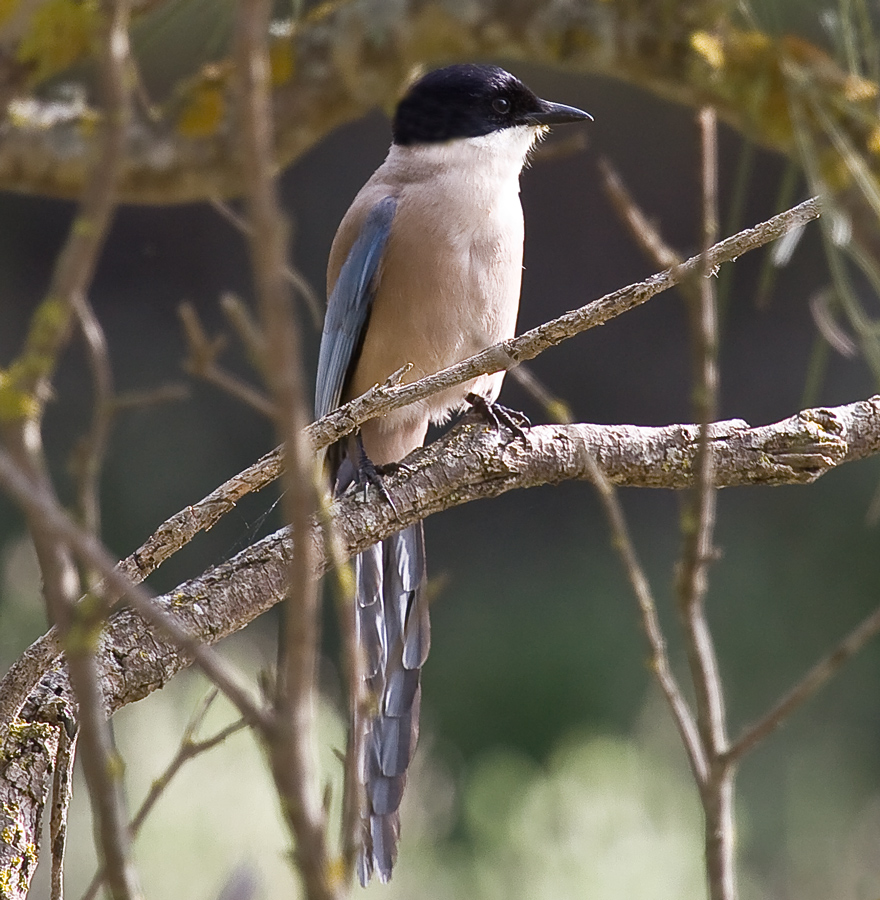
Iberian magpie

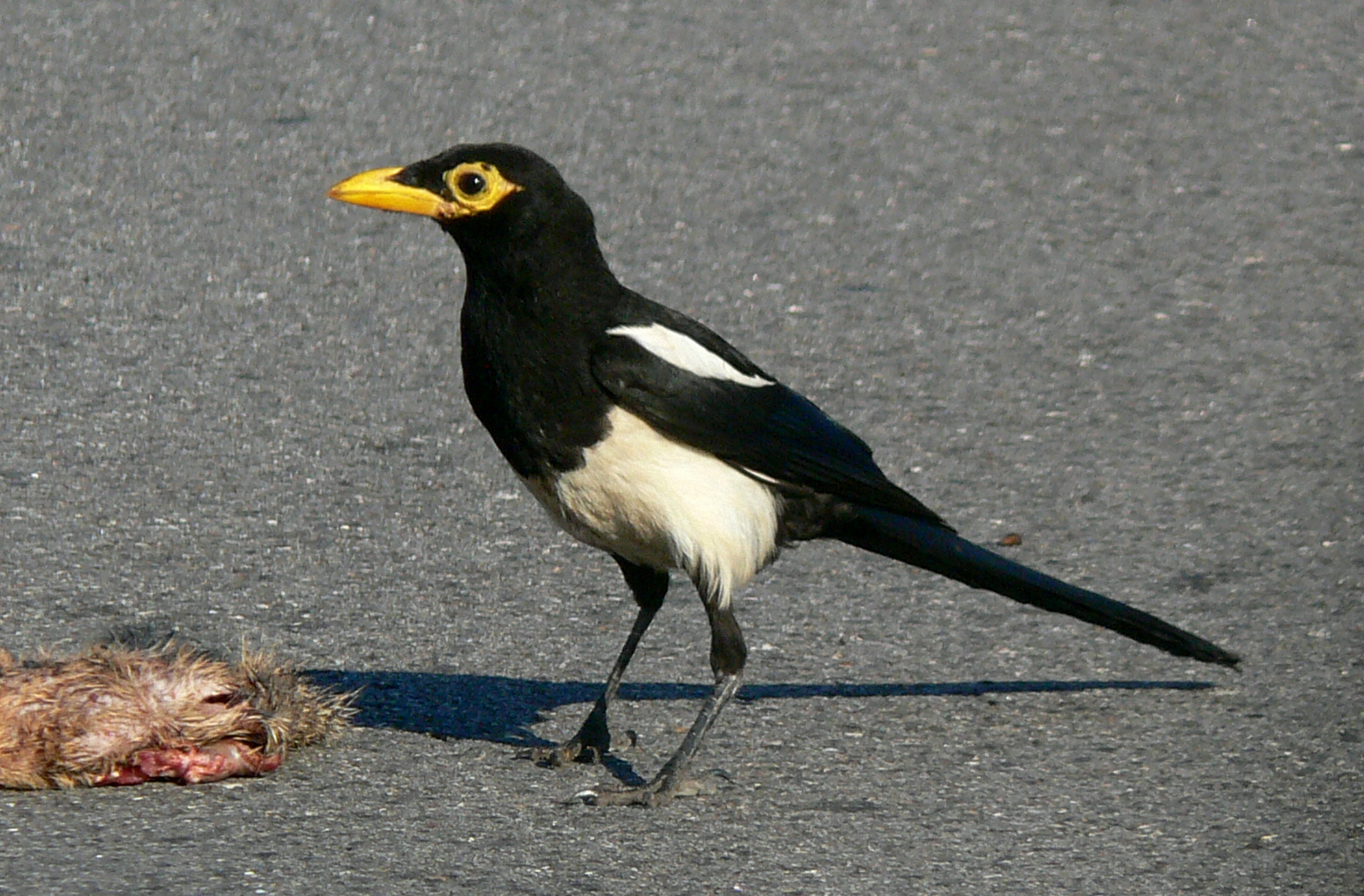
Yellow-billed magpie
