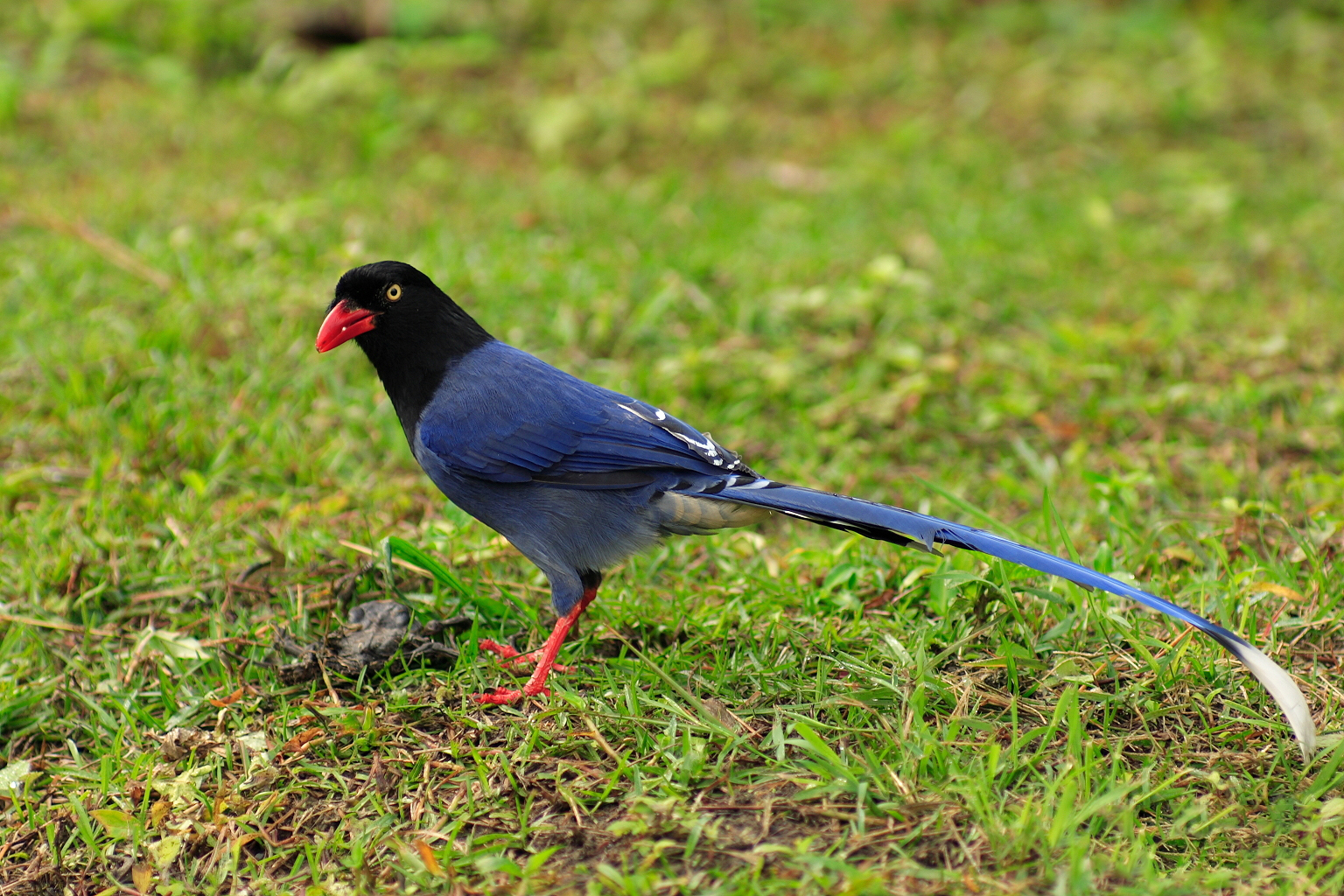
- Urocissa caerulea

Scientific classification
- Kingdom: Animalia
- Phylum: Chordata
- Class: Aves
- Order: Passeriformes
- Family: Corvidae
- Subfamily: Cissinae
- Genus: Urocissa; Cabanis, 1851

Type species
- Urocissa erythrorhyncha Cabanis, 1850

Species
- Urocissa caerulea; Urocissa erythroryncha; Urocissa flavirostris; Urocissa whiteheadi; Urocissa ornata

= Urocissa =

Genus of birds

Urocissa is a genus of birds in the Corvidae, a family that contains the crows, jays, and magpies.

The genus was established by German ornithologist Jean Cabanis in 1850. (Note: Some taxonomists date the publication of Cabanis's description to 1851.) The type species was subsequently designated as the red-billed blue magpie (Urocissa erythroryncha). The name Urocissa combines the Ancient Greek oura meaning "tail" and kissa meaning "magpie" .

== Species ==
The genus contains five species:

Genus Urocissa – Cabanis, 1851 – five species
Common name	Scientific name and subspecies	Range	Size and ecology	IUCN status and estimated population
Taiwan blue magpie	Urocissa caerulea Gould, 1863	Taiwan	Size: Habitat: Diet:	LC
Red-billed blue magpie	Urocissa erythroryncha (Boddaert, 1783) Five subspecies: U. e. occipitalis (Blyth, 1846); U. e. magnirostris (Blyth, 1846); U. e. alticola Birckhead, 1938; U. e. brevivexilla R. Swinhoe, 1874; U. e. erythroryncha (Boddaert, 1783)	Western Himalayas eastwards into Myanmar, Cambodia, Laos, Vietnam and China	Size: Habitat: Diet:	LC
Yellow-billed blue magpie	Urocissa flavirostris (Blyth, 1846)	Indian subcontinent including the lower Himalayas, with a disjunct population in Vietnam	Size: Habitat: Diet:	LC
Sri Lanka blue magpie	Urocissa ornata (Wagler, 1829)	Sri Lanka	Size: Habitat: Diet:	VU
White-winged magpie	Urocissa whiteheadi Ogilvie-Grant, 1899	Southern China, northern Vietnam, and north and central Laos	Size: Habitat: Diet:	EN
