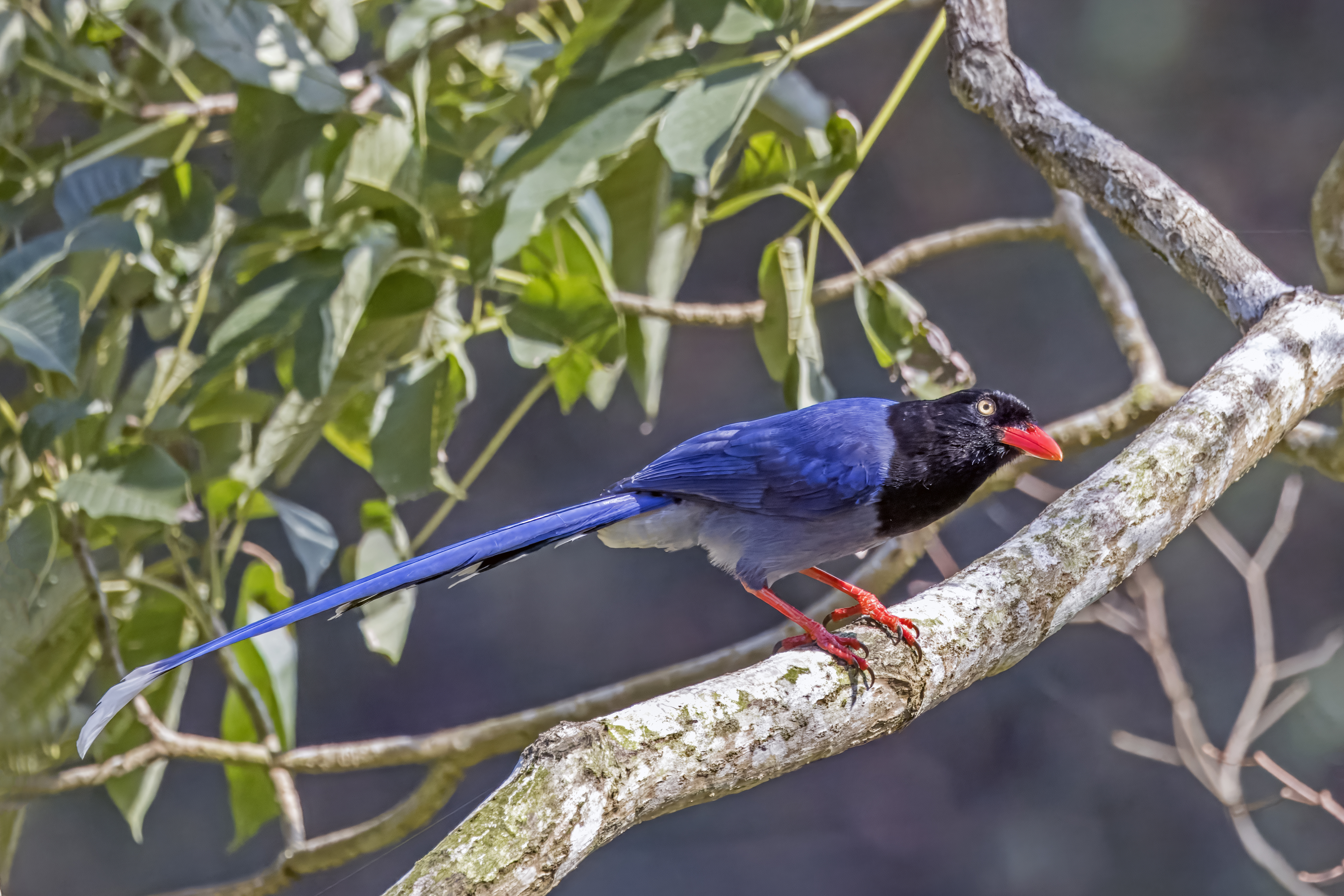

Conservation status
- Least Concern (IUCN 3.1)

Scientific classification
- Kingdom: Animalia
- Phylum: Chordata
- Class: Aves
- Order: Passeriformes
- Family: Corvidae
- Genus: Urocissa
- Species: U. caerulea

Binomial name
- Urocissa caerulea Gould, 1863

= Taiwan blue magpie =

Species of bird

The Taiwan blue magpie (Urocissa caerulea), also called the Taiwan magpie, Formosan blue magpie (Chinese: 臺灣藍鵲; pinyin: Táiwān lán què), or the "long-tailed mountain lady" (Chinese: 長尾山娘; pinyin: Chángwěi shānniáng; Taiwanese Hokkien: Tn̂g-boé soaⁿ-niû), is a bird species in the crow family. It is endemic to Taiwan.

== Taxonomy and systematics ==
The Taiwan blue magpie was collected by Robert Swinhoe and described by John Gould. Swinhoe translated the magpie's Hokkien name into English, calling it the "Long-tailed Mountain-Nymph". The species is sometimes placed in the genus Cissa. It forms a superspecies with the yellow-billed blue magpie (Urocissa flavirostris) and the red-billed blue magpie (Urocissa erythroryncha). The species is monotypic.

== Distribution and habitat ==
The Taiwan blue magpie is endemic to Taiwan. It lives in broadleaf forests at elevations of 300–1,200 m (980–3,940 ft).

== Description ==
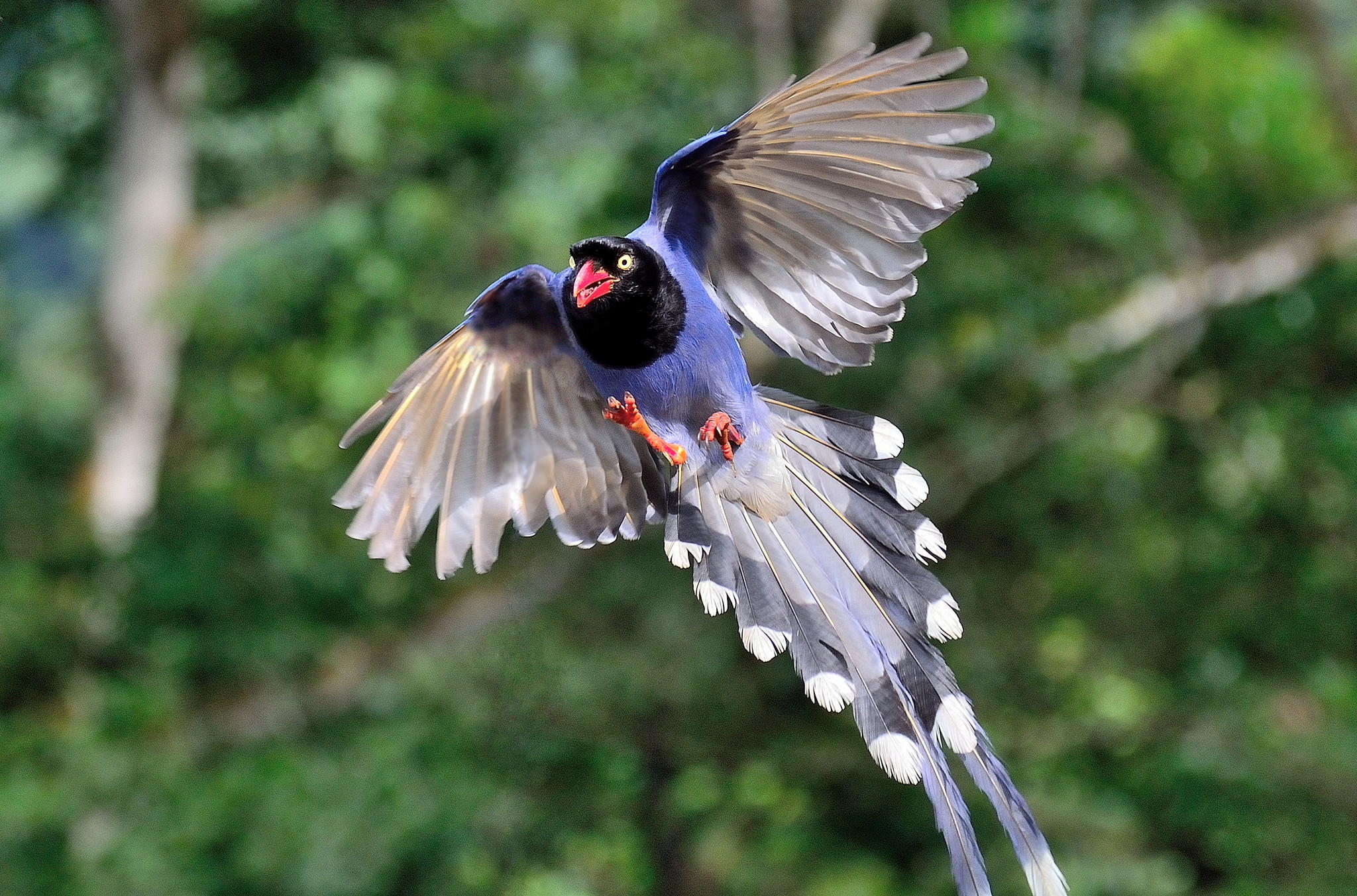
Taiwan blue magpie in flight

It is 63–68 cm (25–27 in) in length. The tail measures around 34–42 cm (13–17 in) in length, and the wings are 20 cm (7.9 in) long. It weighs 254–260 g (9.0–9.2 oz).

The plumages of the male and female are similar. The head, neck and breast are black. The eyes are yellow, and the bill and feet are red. The rest of the plumage is mostly blue. The wings and tail feathers have white tips. The underwing-coverts are dark grey, and the flight feathers are light grey. The uppertail-coverts have black tips. The central pair of tail feathers are the longest. The other tail feathers have black bands. Chicks are greyish, with a short tail and greyish-blue eyes.

== Behavior ==
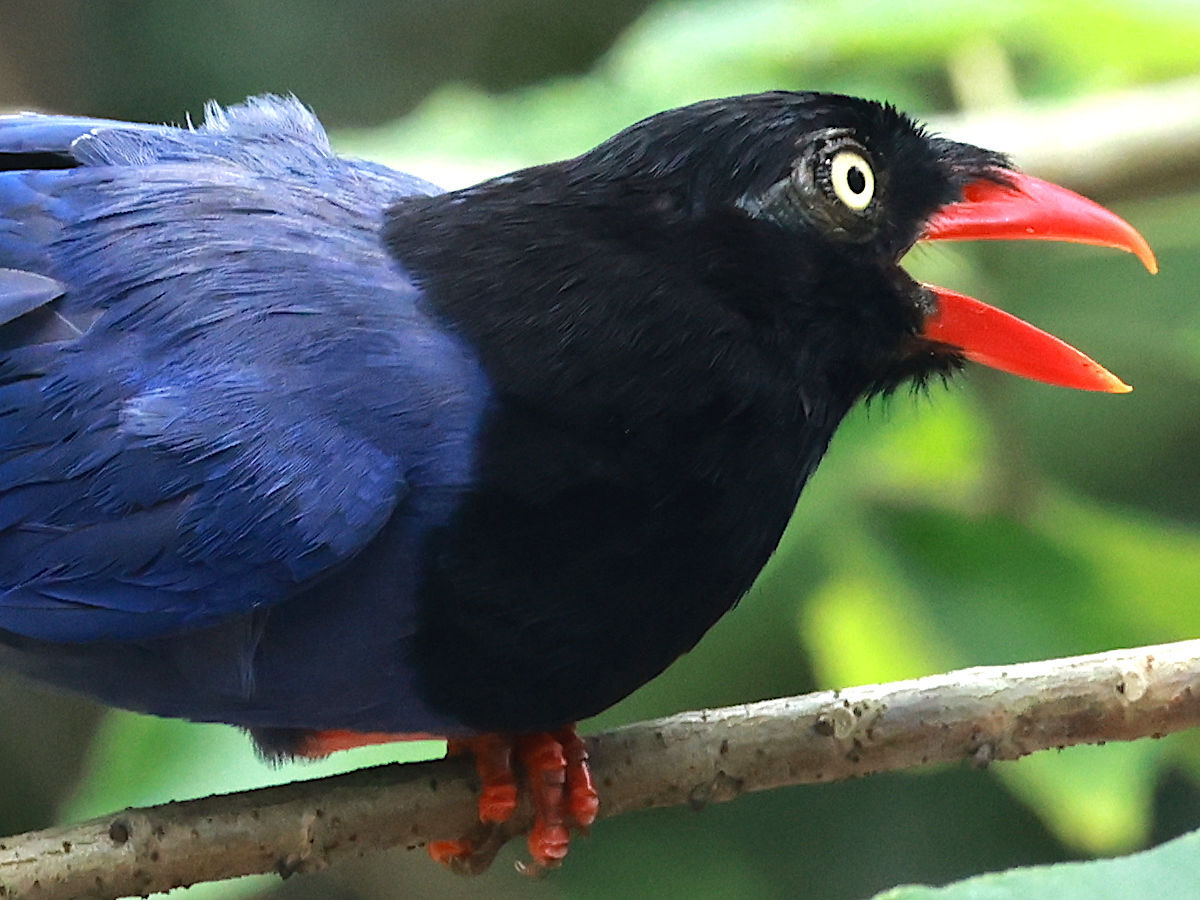
Raucous call

Taiwan blue magpies are not very afraid of people. They can be found near human residences in the mountains or newly cultivated lands. They are gregarious and are usually found in groups of three to twelve. The birds often fly in a line, following each other. This is sometimes called "long-tailed formation".

Similar to other members of the crow family, they have a raucous call which is described as a high-pitched cackling chatter, kyak-kyak-kyak-kyak. Other calls include ga-kang, ga-kang, kwee-eep and gar-suee.

=== Food and feeding ===
Taiwan blue magpies are scavengers and omnivores. Their diet includes snakes, rodents, small insects, carrion, eggs and chicks of other birds, plants, fruits, and seeds. They also feed on food waste of humans. They sometimes store leftovers on the ground and cover them with leaves for future retrieval. Sometimes they store food in the leaves or branches.

=== Breeding ===
The breeding season is from March to July. The Taiwan blue magpie is monogamous. Females incubate eggs while males help with nest building and feeding. Their nests are built on high branches of trees. The nest is in the shape of a bowl and is made of twigs. Usually there are 3–8 eggs in a clutch. Eggs are light green in color, with brown marks. Hatching takes 17–19 days. There are 3–7 chicks per nest. Chicks leave the nest after 21–24 days, and can start flying for short distances after a few days. Some pairs breed a second time after this. The Taiwan blue magpie has helpers at the nest, mostly juveniles from previous breeding seasons. They help to feed the chicks and defend the nest. Taiwan blue magpies have a strong nest defence behaviour, and will attack intruders until they leave.

=== Threats ===
Taiwan blue magpies may be hit by cars or captured by humans. They are also killed by predators, such as the crested goshawk, white-bellied sea eagle, spot-bellied eagle owl and the Gurney's eagle.

== Relationship with humans ==
Taiwan blue magpie is the sacred bird of Taiwan aborigine Tsou, Thao, and Bunun peoples. The sacred bird is called Teofsi'za in Tsou, Fitfit in Thao, and Haipis (Isbukun group) / Kaipis in Bunun. In the common great flood myths of Taiwan Austronesian peoples, in Tsou, Thao, and Bunun sagas, the last surviving peoples escaped from the great flood to high mountain summits as the last refuge. The sacred bird Taiwan blue magpie sacrificed itself and helped the peoples to carry the last fire tinder from Yu Shan summit back to the peoples. (in some versions of the sagas, the sacred bird is considered to be black bulbul (Note: The famous Japanese naturalist Dr. Kano Tadao (ja:鹿野忠雄), in his book of Taiwan alpinism records in his high school and college times "And Mountains, and Clouds, and Savages (Japanese: 山と雲と蕃人と)", in page 188 of the book, said the sacred bird in Bunun saga is '..."クロヒヨドリ", seems to be "Microscelis leucocephalus nigerrimus (Gould)"...'. Microscelis leucocephalus nigerrimus is Hypsipetes leucocephalus nigerrimus in modern taxonomy, or black bulbul; in Chinese translation version of the book (Hanzi: 山、雲與蕃人), Yang, Nan-jun (zh-TW:楊南郡), in page 183, 268 translator's notes, said some Bunun people's versions of sacred bird is Taiwan blue magpie.)).

Taiwan blue magpies have attacked humans to defend their nests. Taiwan blue magpies are sometimes illegally captured by humans, but the number of cases of this seems to have decreased.

In 2007, the Taiwan International Birding Associated held a vote to select the national bird of Taiwan. Participation was not limited to those in Taiwan, and there were over 1 million votes cast from 53 countries. The Taiwan blue magpie defeated the Mikado pheasant, but the vote was not formally accepted.

In 2017 China Airlines unveiled a Taiwan blue magpie paint scheme on an Airbus A350. The aircraft was the 100th A350 produced by Airbus.

The AIDC XAT-5 Blue Magpie advanced jet trainer is named after the Taiwan blue magpie.

== Status ==
The IUCN Red List of Threatened Species has currently assessed the species to be of least concern as it does not meet the criteria to be vulnerable. The population trend is suspected to be stable. Due to its endemism, however, the Taiwan blue magpie has been listed as other conservation-deserving wildlife (Chinese: 其他應予保育之野生動物) and protected by Taiwan's Wildlife Conservation Act (Chinese: 野生動物保育法).

There is a small population of red-billed blue magpies that has been introduced to Wuling Farm in Taichung County (now part of Taichung City). In 2007, three hybrid chicks were found in a nest in Taichung, with red-billed and Taiwan magpie parents tending them. This caused some concern to conservationists, given the decline of the Taiwan hwamei due to the invasion of the Chinese hwamei. However, the Endemic Species Research Institute of Taiwan has been working to control red-billed magpie populations by capturing individual birds and relocating their nests.

== See also ==
- List of protected species in Taiwan
- List of endemic birds of Taiwan
- List of endemic species of Taiwan
