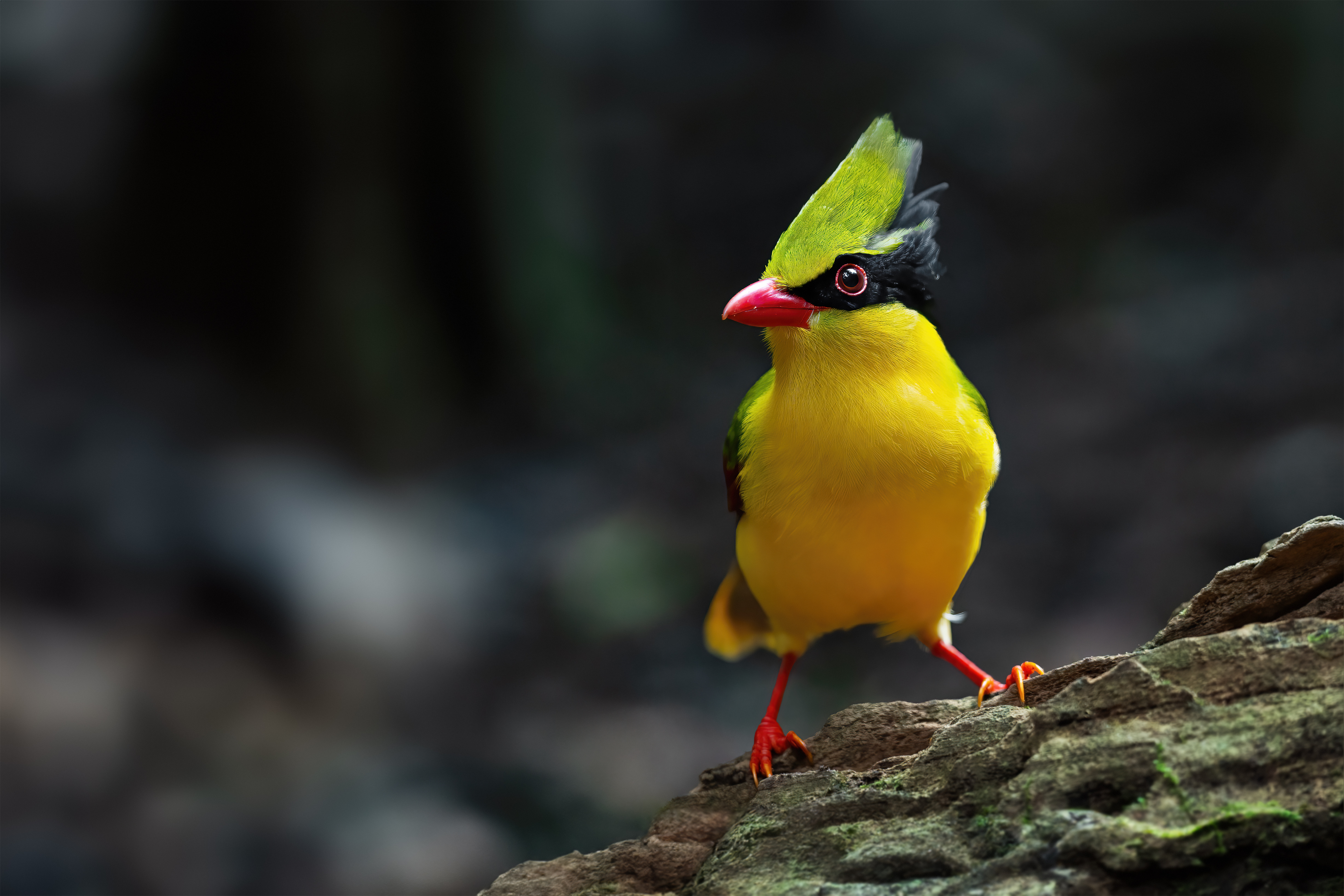
- In Lâm Đồng province, Vietnam

Conservation status
- Least Concern (IUCN 3.1)

Scientific classification
- Kingdom: Animalia
- Phylum: Chordata
- Class: Aves
- Order: Passeriformes
- Family: Corvidae
- Genus: Cissa
- Species: C. hypoleuca

Binomial name
- Cissa hypoleuca Salvadori & Giglioli, 1885

= Indochinese green magpie =

Species of bird

The Indochinese green magpie (Cissa hypoleuca), also known as the yellow-breasted magpie, is a small colourful bird native to the forests of China and Vietnam.

== Taxonomy ==
The Indochinese green magpie was formally described in 1885 by the Italian zoologists Tommaso Salvadori and Enrico Hillyer Giglioli under the current binomial name Cissa hypoleuca based on a specimen collected in Thủ Dầu Một near Ho Chi Minh City in southern Vietnam. The specific epithet hypoleuca combines the Ancient Greek ὑπο/hupo meaning "beneath" with λευκος/leukos meaning "white".

The genus Cissa includes three other short-tailed magpies species: the common green magpie (Cissa chinensis), the Javan green magpie (Cissa thalassina), and the Bornean green magpie (Cissa jefferyi). The name Cissa is derived from the Ancient Greek kissa which means a "jay" or "magpie" and the genus was discovered by Friedrich Boie in 1826. They all look very similar with their green plumage, iridescent red bill and black mask. They are part of the Corvidae family with crows, ravens, jays, amongst many others. As a perching bird, it is in the order Passeriformes, which includes more than half of all bird species.

=== Subspecies ===
Five subspecies are recognised:

- C. h. jini Delacour, 1930 – central south China
- C. h. concolor Delacour & Jabouille, 1928 – north Vietnam
- C. h. chauleti Delacour, 1926 – central Vietnam
- C. h. hypoleuca Salvadori & Giglioli, 1885 – southeast Thailand and south Indochina
- C. h. katsumatae Rothschild, 1903 – Hainan Island (off southeast China)

== Description ==
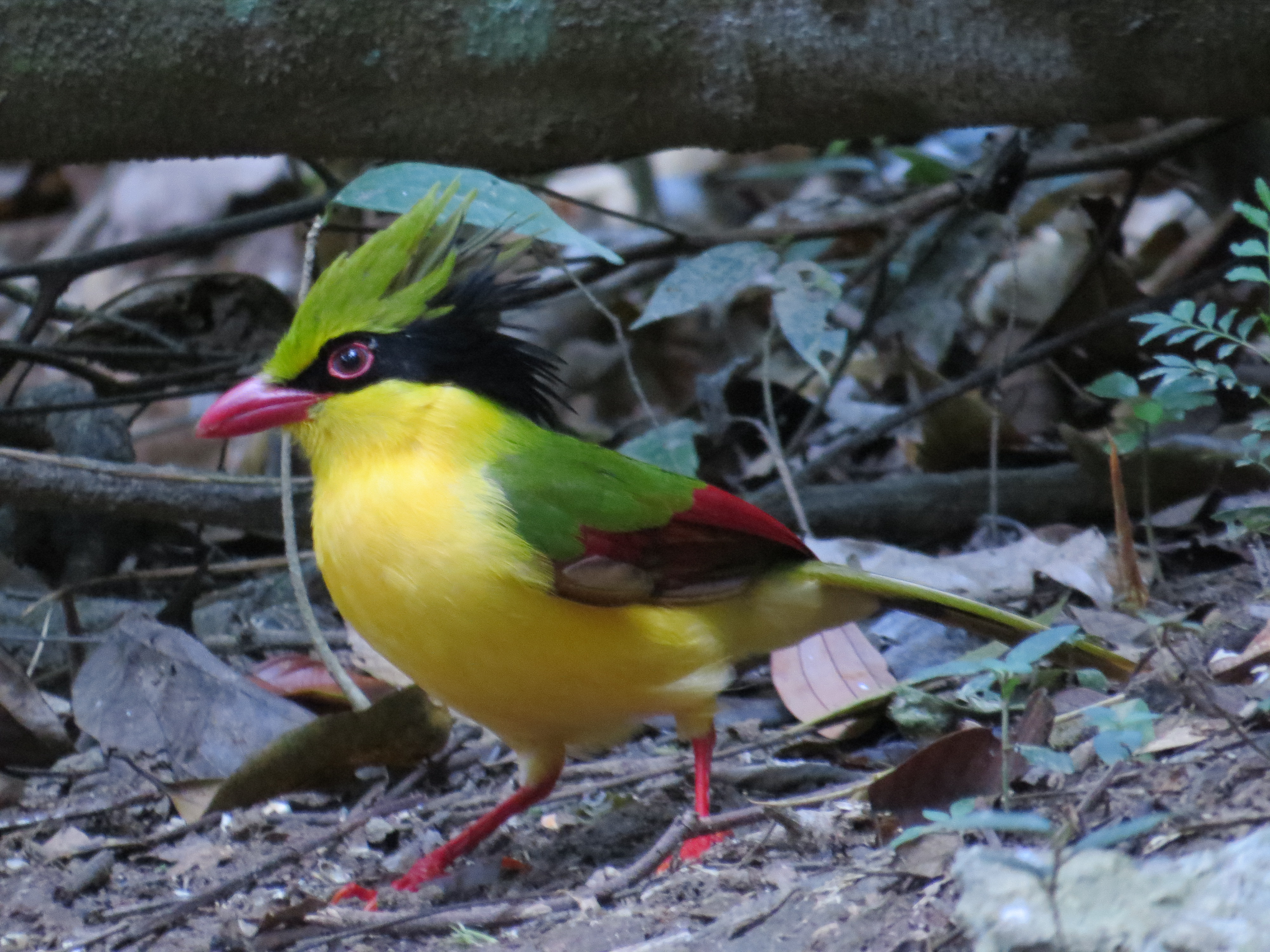
Normal plumage with yellow underbelly

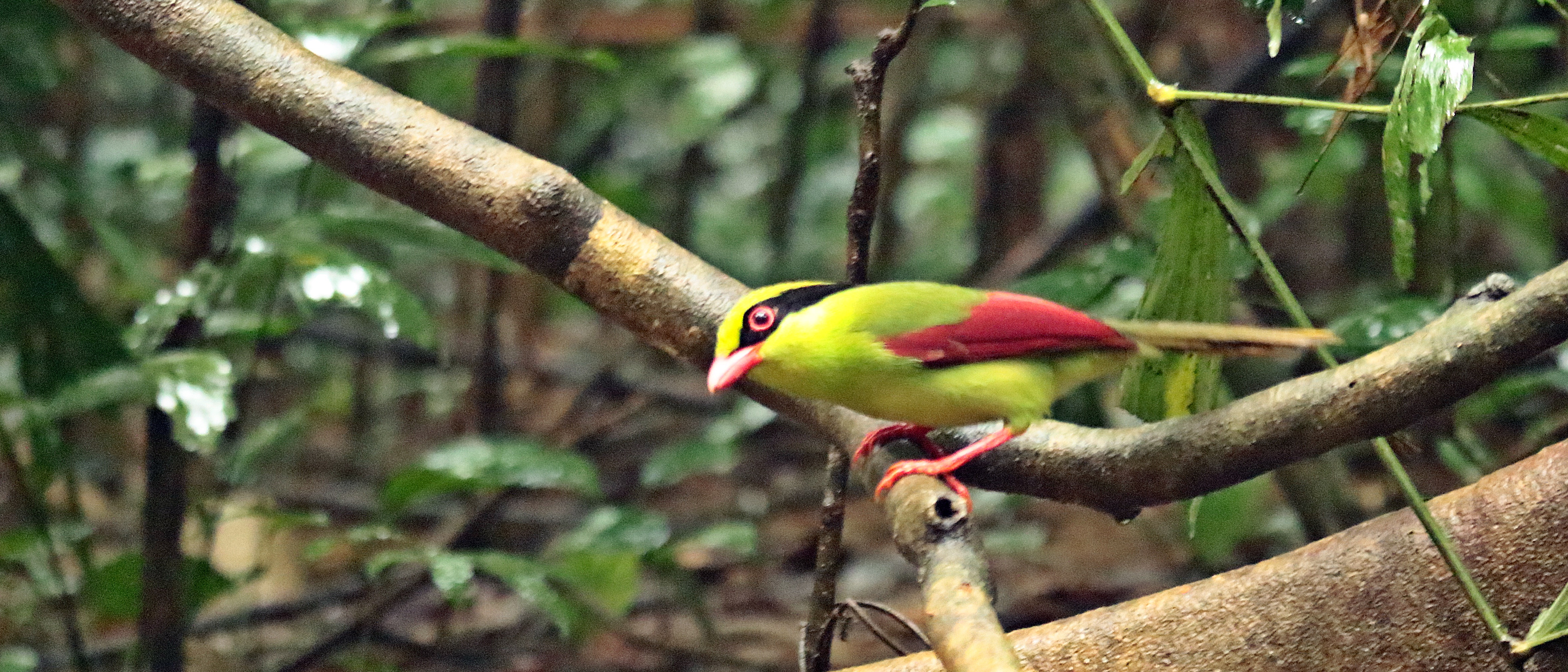
Indochinese green magpie

This small bird is approximately 35 cm (14 in) in length and has a unique fluorescent plumage just like the other members of the Cissa genus. However, its body is mostly green and those with an underbelly of yellow color are unique to the southern populations in Southeast Asia with the exception of the Chinese population that still have green underbellies, just like the other Cissa birds. They have a black band that goes from their bill, over their crimson eyes, and to the back of their head, that looks similar to the mask of the popular movie character Zorro. They have long reddish-brown flight feathers, and a bill and legs that are brightly red colored. Both sexes look mostly similar, but the juveniles have duller colors than the adults. Duller colors can also be seen when the birds are exposed to too much sunlight.

== Distribution and habitat ==
The yellow-breasted magpie is native to Asia, and can be found in China, Laos, Thailand and Vietnam. It can tolerate altitudes of up to 1,500 meters (4,900 ft) and they span over a region of about 1,920,000 km^{2} (740,000 sq mi). They stay in these areas all year long and do not migrate.

It can be found in moist forests within the tropical and subtropical regions of their distribution. Due to their bright green plumage, they can be seen easily when jumping from branch to branch in foliage. Therefore this is why they mainly occur in the tree canopies of forests, as this camouflages their green plumage better, protecting them from predation.

== Behavior ==
This passerine bird is very loud and loves to hang out in the foliage of its forest habitat. They have been spotted alone, in pairs, or in small groups. They can be sometimes seen in mixed flocks with laughingthrushes (Garrulax leucolophus) and drongos. The Indochinese green magpie does not migrate and stays in its native range. It has a mainly carnivorous diet and eats lot of different things. An adult Indochinese green magpie once lived for 18 years in captivity. When hunting their prey, they stalk it, corner it and then the male will make the kill.

=== Vocalizations ===
Much like other corvids, the Indochinese green magpie is a songbird and has a very good and precise control of its syrinx. It can produce sounds like noisy chattering, rasping notes, screeches, and ringing whistles. They can generate high-pitched series of notes that sounds like "po-puueeee-chuk", followed by lower pitched "eeeoooeeep groak".

=== Food and feeding ===
The yellow-breasted magpie can eat a lot of different things, as it is carnivorous. Its diet includes small frogs, insects, eggs of snakes and lizards, and nestlings. The insects from its diet eat a lot of lutein-rich plants, which is a yellow carotenoid pigment. This component is what makes the birds from the Cissa genus go from blue to bright green. Malnourished birds can be found to be more of a blue color due to the lack of the lutein pigment, since its body does not produce it.

=== Breeding ===
The month of May appears to be the month when their breeding is recorded. They were found to lay approximately 4 eggs in captivity. They place their nest hidden in a tree at a height of 2–3 meters (6.6–9.8 ft) above the ground. Their nest resembles a bowl made of small branches. Its generation length is of 6.7 years.

== Conservation ==
The Indochinese green magpie has been assessed to be of least concern in 2016 by the IUCN red list. Its current population trend is declining, but the decline is not pronounced enough for them to be considered vulnerable. The decline is caused partially by habitat destruction in Hainan. Another reason would be that the Indochinese green magpie is targeted in the illegal pet trade. Its bright and beautiful colors often makes it an ideal exotic pet, especially as it is very appreciated by birdwatchers. It is difficult to gauge the concurrent status of conservation of the Indochinese green magpie as we have not been able to quantify its global population size.
