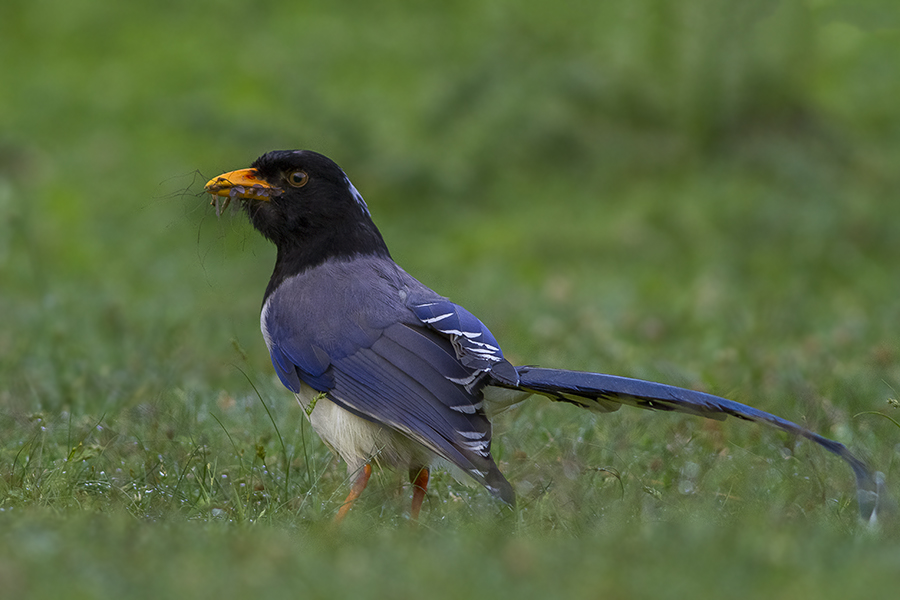
- From Chopta, Uttarakhand, India

Conservation status
- Least Concern (IUCN 3.1)

Scientific classification
- Kingdom: Animalia
- Phylum: Chordata
- Class: Aves
- Order: Passeriformes
- Family: Corvidae
- Genus: Urocissa
- Species: U. flavirostris

Binomial name
- Urocissa flavirostris (Blyth, 1846)

= Yellow-billed blue magpie =

Species of bird

The yellow-billed blue-magpie or gold-billed magpie (Urocissa flavirostris) is a passerine bird in the family Corvidae, along with crows and jays. It forms a superspecies with the Taiwan blue magpie and the red-billed blue magpie. The species' range covers the northern parts of the Indian subcontinent, including the lower Himalayan foothills, with a disjunct population in Vietnam.

== Description ==
Length 66 cm (26 in), including tail of about 46 cm (18 in). Sexes alike. Head, neck, and breast black, with a white patch on the nape; remainder of lower plumage white, faintly tinged with lilac; whole upper plumage purplish-blue, brighter on the wings and tail; flight feathers tipped with white, along with white outermost wing feathers; tail long and graduated, with blue feathers tipped with white, except for the very long central pair which have a band of black in front of the white

== Distribution ==
The yellow-billed blue magpie is found throughout the Himalayas from Hazara to the Brahmaputra. It is divided into two sub-species. Of these, U. f. cucullata is the more common and is found from the Western boundary of the range to Western Nepal, being common through most of the hill stations of the Western Himalayas, breeding in a zone from 1,500 to 3,000 m (4,920 to 9,840 ft). The eastern form is found from Eastern Nepal eastwards and differs in that the under parts have a darker lilac tinge; its zone is slightly higher than that of the Western form, and it seldom occurs as low as 1,830 m (6,000 ft). It is a resident species, but during the winter months it usually moves to lower elevations. From Simla eastwards, the closely related red-billed blue magpie (Urocissa erythroryncha) is often found in the same areas as the yellow-billed species; it is particularly common about Mussoorie, Tehri-Garhwal, -Kumaon, and in Nepal, and may be easily distinguished by its red beak and the greater extent of the white nape-patch.

== Behaviour ==
The blue magpies are primarily arboreal birds. While most common in areas of dense jungle, they can also be found in agriculture areas and bare mountain sides at higher elevation. They frequently feed on the ground and adopt a hopping gait with the tail held high to prevent it coming into contact with the ground. They live in parties of seven or eight birds and are highly territorial. Their flight is slow and undulating once the bird comes into the open. Their diet consists of small mammals, the eggs and young of other birds, insects, wild fruits and berries. This bird is very vocal with a variety of vocalizations.

=== Nesting ===
The magpies build their nests in the forks of trees in areas of heavy foliage. The large nests are constructed out of sticks and lined with grass and other fibers. The clutch consists of three or four eggs. The base-colour varies from a pale, dingy yellowish-stone colour to a darkish rather reddish-stone colour, and there is very occasionally a faint greenish tinge. The markings consist of small specks, blotches, streaks, and mottlings of various shades of brown, sienna 1 or purple, and they generally tend to collect in a cap or zone about the broad end of the egg.

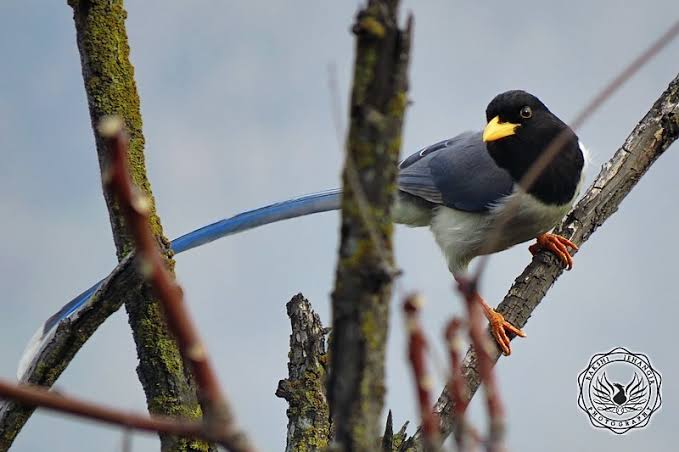
Yellow-billed blue Magpie at Gulmarg, Kashmir

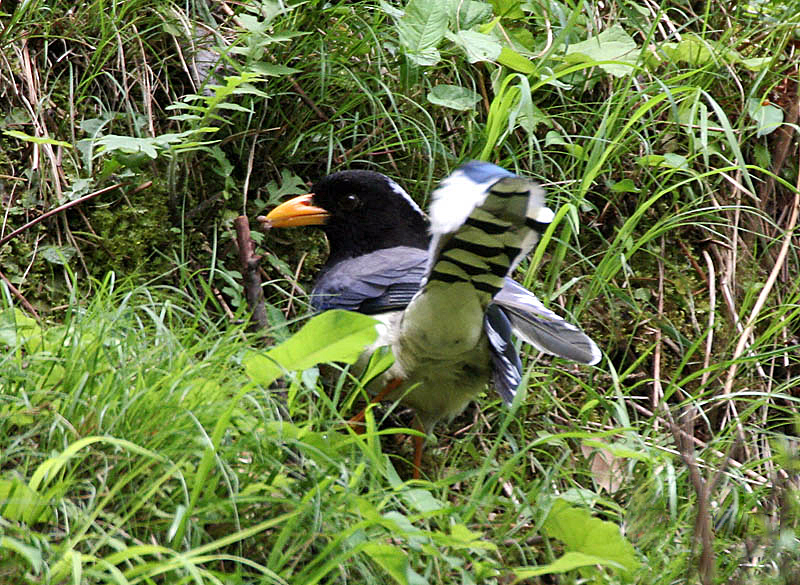
Yellow-billed blue magpie at Kullu - Manali District of Himachal Pradesh, India

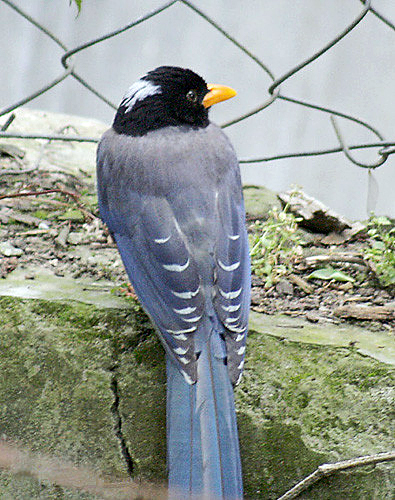
at Kullu

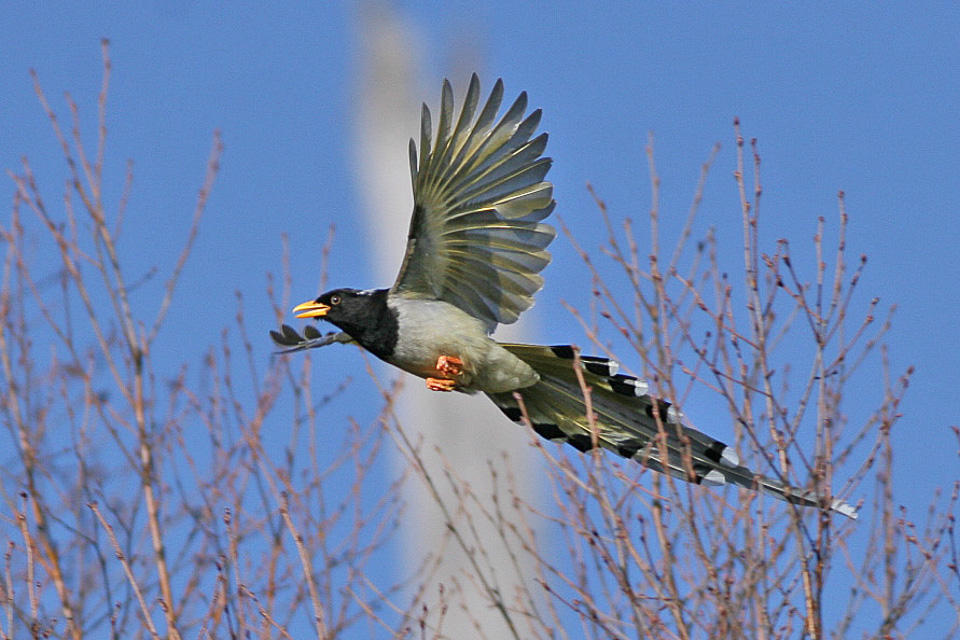
at Bhutan

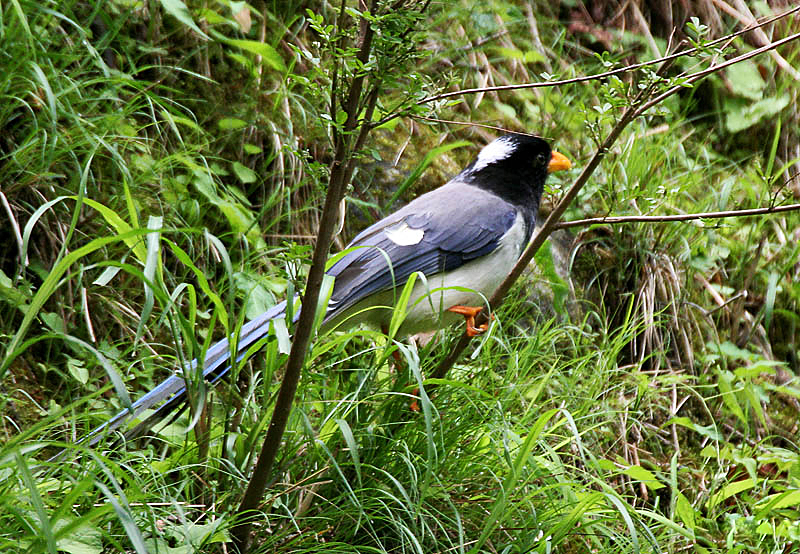
at Kullu

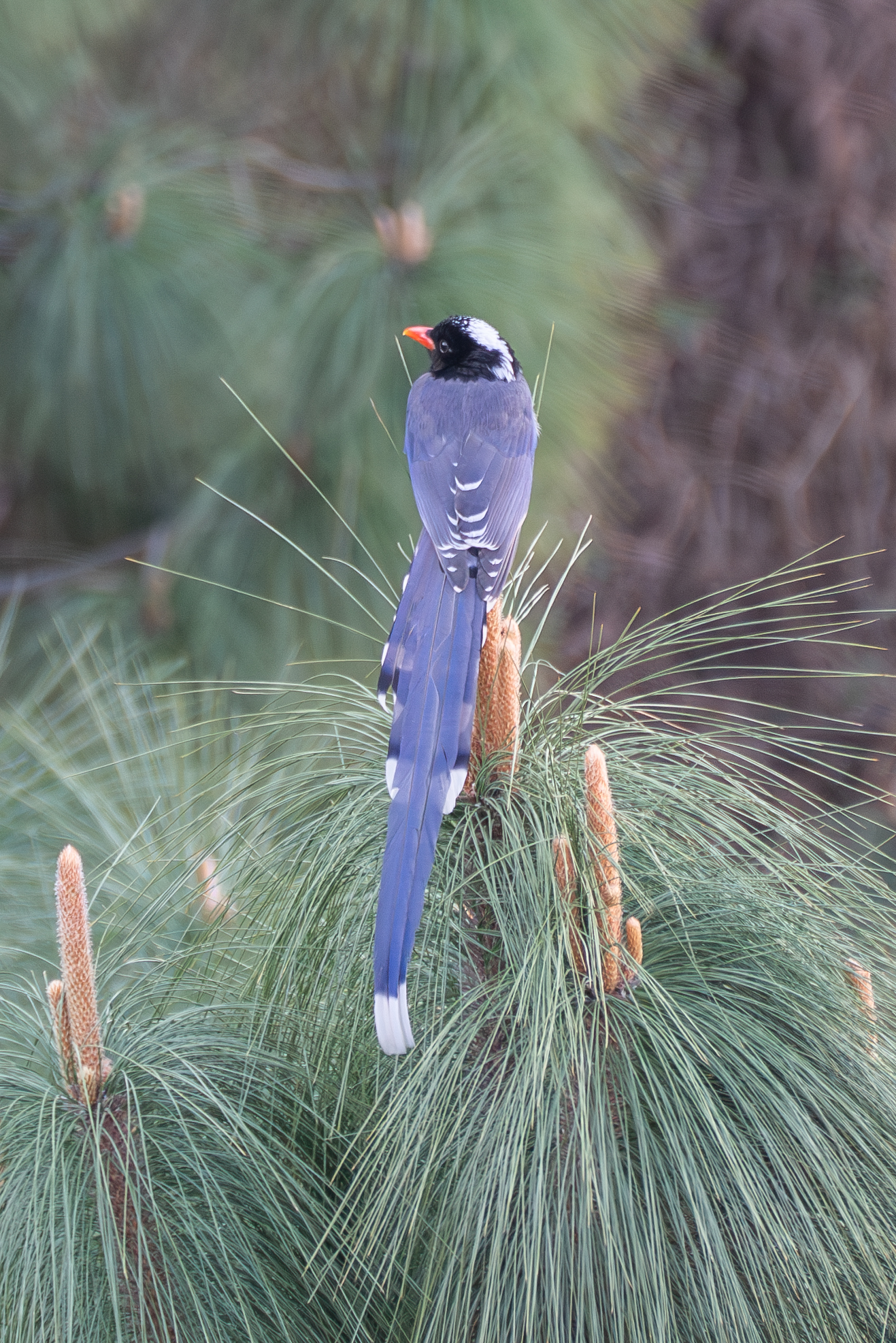
at Kasauli
The yellow-billed blue magpie or gold-billed magpie in natural habitat at Lohna, Palampur
