= Sri Lanka blue magpie =

- At Sinharaja Forest Reserve, Sri Lanka

Conservation status
- Vulnerable (IUCN 3.1)

Scientific classification
- Kingdom: Animalia
- Phylum: Chordata
- Class: Aves
- Order: Passeriformes
- Family: Corvidae
- Genus: Urocissa
- Species: U. ornata

Binomial name
- Urocissa ornata (Wagler, 1829)
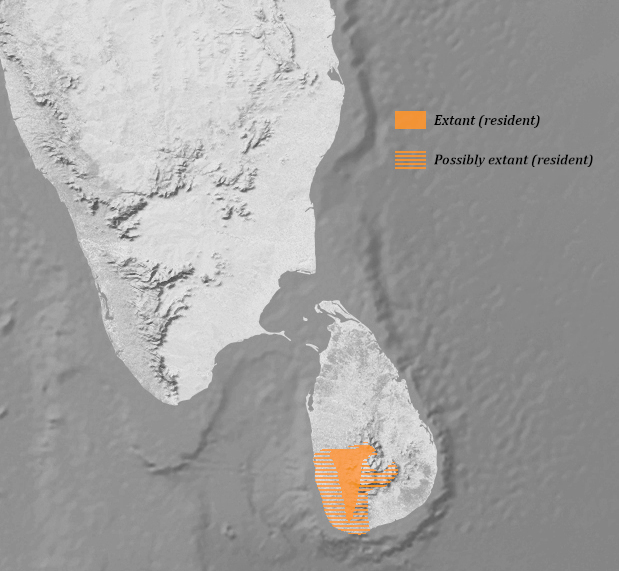
- Distribution map for Sri Lanka Blue Magpie

Species of bird

The Sri Lanka blue magpie or Ceylon magpie (Urocissa ornata) is a brightly coloured member of the family Corvidae, found exclusively in Sri Lanka. This species is adapted to hunting in the dense canopy, where it is highly active and nimble. Its flight is rather weak, though, and is rarely used to cover great distances. In spite of its ability to adapt to the presence of humans, it is classified as vulnerable to extinction due to the fragmentation and destruction of its habitat of dense primary forest in the wet zone of southern Sri Lanka.

== Description ==
The Sri Lanka blue magpie measures 42–47 cm (17–19 in) in length, which is larger than a mynah, but smaller than a crow. It has a sturdy bill. Its plumage is bright blue, with a reddish-brown or chestnut head, neck, and wing. The blue tail is long and graduated, with a white tip. The bill, legs, feet, and featherless eye ring of this species are all vibrant red. Both the male and female of the species share this description. The juvenile of this species has a plumage similar to that of an adult, but overall duller, with a brown eye ring and a greyish hue to its blue feathers, especially on its underside. Its moulting season is from August to November.

== Taxonomy ==
The Sri Lanka blue magpie is a member of the order Passeriformes, in the family Corvidae.

This species belongs to Urocissa, a genus of Southeast Asian magpies, They share a recent common ancestor with another genus of Asian magpies, Cissa. Both Urocissa and Cissa are genera of the Oriental region, where the diversity of corvid species originated. They share a distant common ancestor with new world jays and magpies.

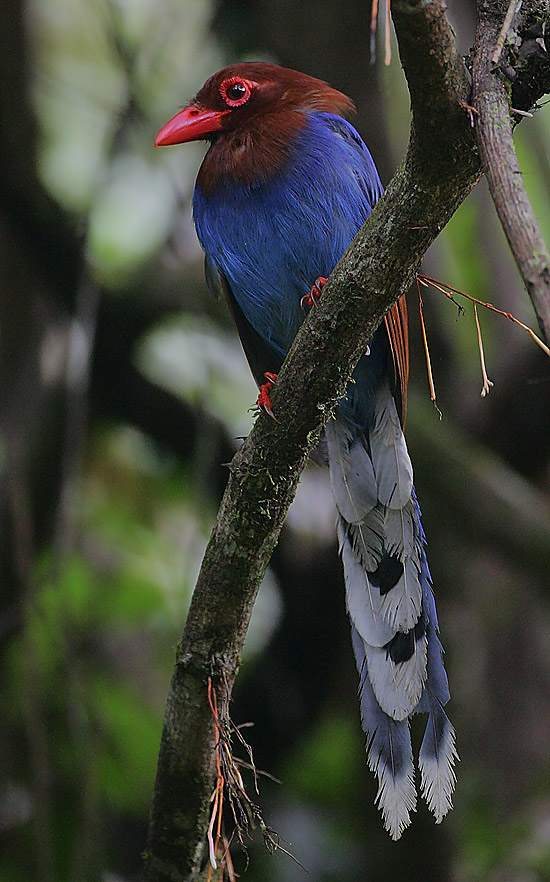
from Sinharaja rainforest

== Habitat and distribution ==
This species is endemic to Sri Lanka, where it is found in tall, undisturbed forest in the mountains, foothills, and adjoining lowlands of the wet zone. It is found from elevations of below 150 to 2,150 m (490 to 7,050 ft). It is not often seen in disturbed habitat such as gardens or plantations.

Surveys conducted from 2004 to 2006 found individuals of this species in 38 separate forest patches contained within six forest complexes within its range in the wet zone of southern Sri Lanka.

== Behaviour ==
In spite of their avoidance of human-disturbed habitats, the Sri Lanka blue magpie tolerates and is even attracted to the presence of humans. In response to low and moderate levels of recreational disturbance, and small to medium-sized groups of human visitors, numbers of Sri Lanka blue magpies increased, unlike other birds included in the study. A group of individuals was often observed waiting near trails, expecting to be fed by groups of human visitors.

=== Vocal behaviour ===
The Sri Lanka blue magpie produces a great variety of calls, including a jingle, a chink-chink, crakrakrakrak, and a whee-whee.

Thirteen different common call types have been identified, including mimicry calls. Individuals have been recorded using two raptor calls quite frequently, usually while mobbing a predator (the Accipiter high-pitched call and the mountain hawk-eagle (Nisaetus nipalensis kelaarti) call) These raptor calls are mimicked by another species that occupies the same region, the greater racket-tailed drongo (Dicrurus paradiseus), implying that these imitated predator calls can act as alarm signals for multiple species.

Sri Lanka blue magpies do not just imitate the calls of predators, however. They have been observed mimicking the calls and songs of other birds in their prolonged and elaborate subsong.

=== Diet ===
These birds use their strong legs and feet to forage, and have been observed hanging upside down and holding down their prey with ease.

Their diet is mainly carnivorous, featuring insects, frogs, and small lizards, but they have been known to consume fruit, as well, and some observations suggest that they also prey on eggs or young of other bird species. Sri Lanka blue magpies have been observed rubbing hairy caterpillars against mossy branches to remove irritating hairs prior to consuming them.

=== Reproduction ===
Sri Lanka blue magpies are monogamous, use co-operative breeding to raise their young, and can be seen in small flocks of up to seven birds, while each bird maintains a territory.

The generation length is 6.7 years. Breeding season is from January through March, and three to five eggs, which are white covered with brown spots, are laid in a clutch. Cup-shaped nests are built atop small, slender trees and lined with soft materials like lichen.

Both sexes build the nest and feed offspring, with only the female incubating them.

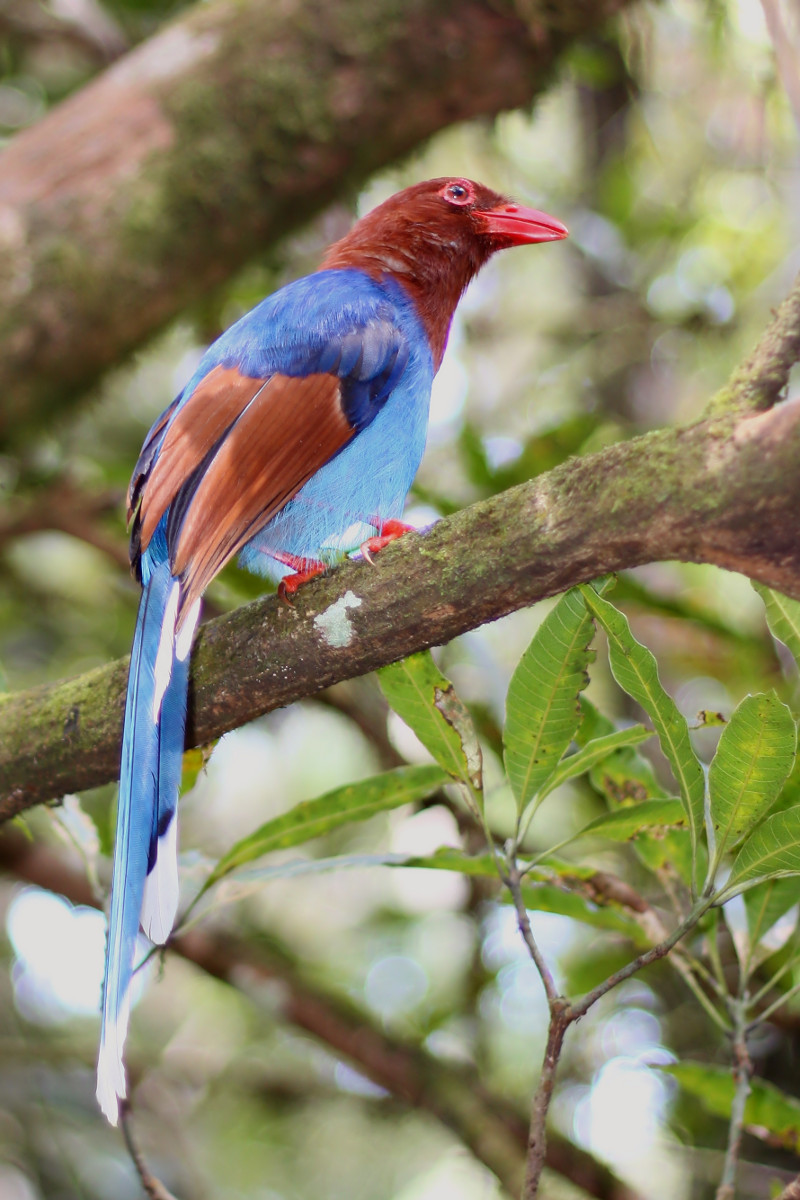

== Conservation status ==
The Sri Lanka blue magpie is listed as vulnerable, due to the fragmentation and ongoing decline of the population. Surveys performed in 2004-2006 estimate the population at 10,181-19,765 individuals, although their breeding strategy of monogamy and co-operative breeding has led to that estimate being reduced to 9,500-19,500 individuals total to reflect their effective population size.

The main threat to the survival is habitat loss due to forest being cleared for agricultural land, mines, logging, and human settlement. A moratorium on logging in wet zones in 1990, plus the legal protection of this species in Sri Lanka, have the potential to slow their population decline, but air pollution causing forest die-back and the use of biocides in the hill country continue to threaten the species.

One of the factors preventing it from colonising disturbed habitat has been suggested to be the presence of another bird, the Asian koel (Eudynamys scolopaceus), which is a brood parasite.

== In culture ==
In Sri Lanka, this bird is known as කැහිබෙල්ලා (kehibella) in Sinhala. The blue magpie appears on a 10c Sri Lankan postal stamp, which was in wide usage in the 1980s through 1990s.
