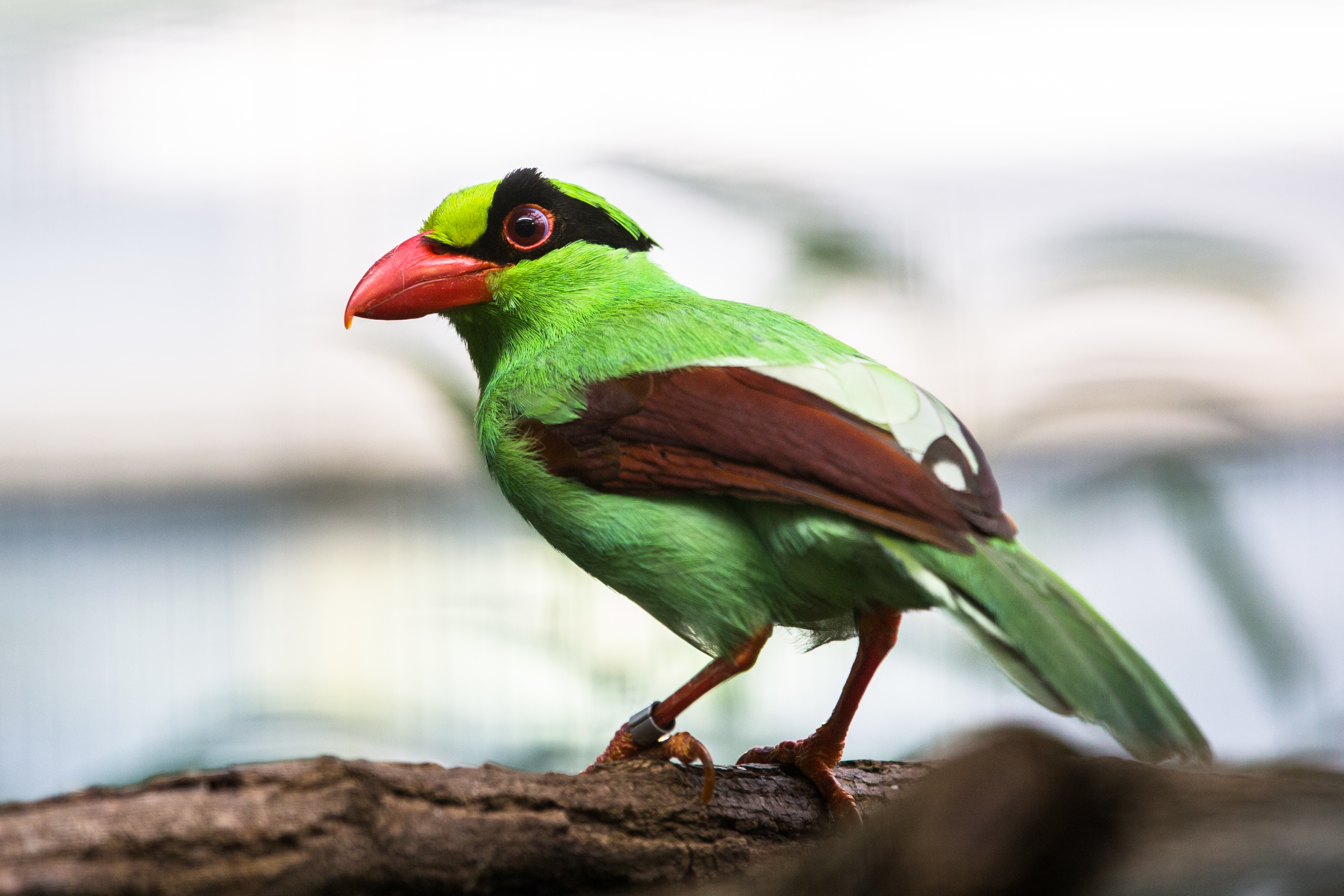
- Javan green magpie (Cissa thalassina)

Scientific classification
- Kingdom: Animalia
- Phylum: Chordata
- Class: Aves
- Order: Passeriformes
- Family: Corvidae
- Subfamily: Cissinae
- Genus: Cissa; F. Boie, 1826

Type species
- Coracias sinensis Gmelin, 1788

Species
- Cissa chinensis; Cissa hypoleuca; Cissa jefferyi; Cissa thalassina

= Cissa (bird) =

Genus of birds

Cissa is a genus of relatively short-tailed magpies, sometimes known as hunting cissas, that reside in the forests of tropical and subtropical southeast Asia and adjacent regions. The four species are quite similar with bright red bills, primarily green plumage, black mask, and rufous wings.

Due to a low-carotenoid diet they often appear blue or turquoise in captivity; the structural color of their feathers. They are carnivorous, and mainly feed on arthropods and small vertebrates.

== Taxonomy ==
The genus was introduced by the German zoologist Friedrich Boie in 1826 with the common green magpie (Cissa chinensis) as the type species. The name Cissa is from the Ancient Greek kissa meaning a "jay" or "magpie".

The genus Cissa contains four species:

Species of Cissa
Common and binomial names	Image	Description	Range
Common green magpie (Cissa chinensis)		Common green magpies have long tail feathers, striped black and white tertiaries, and a subtle yellow cap	Lower Himalayas to mainland southeast Asia, as well as Borneo and Sumatra
Indochinese green magpie (Cissa hypoleuca)		Unique to this genus, indochinese green magpies have a yellow underbelly	Mainland southeast Asia and adjacent parts of China
Javan green magpie (Cissa thalassina)		Javan green magpies have short tails and white tertiary feathers	Java
Bornean green magpie (Cissa jefferyi)		Bornean green magpies look much like the other species in this genus but have white irises	Borneo
