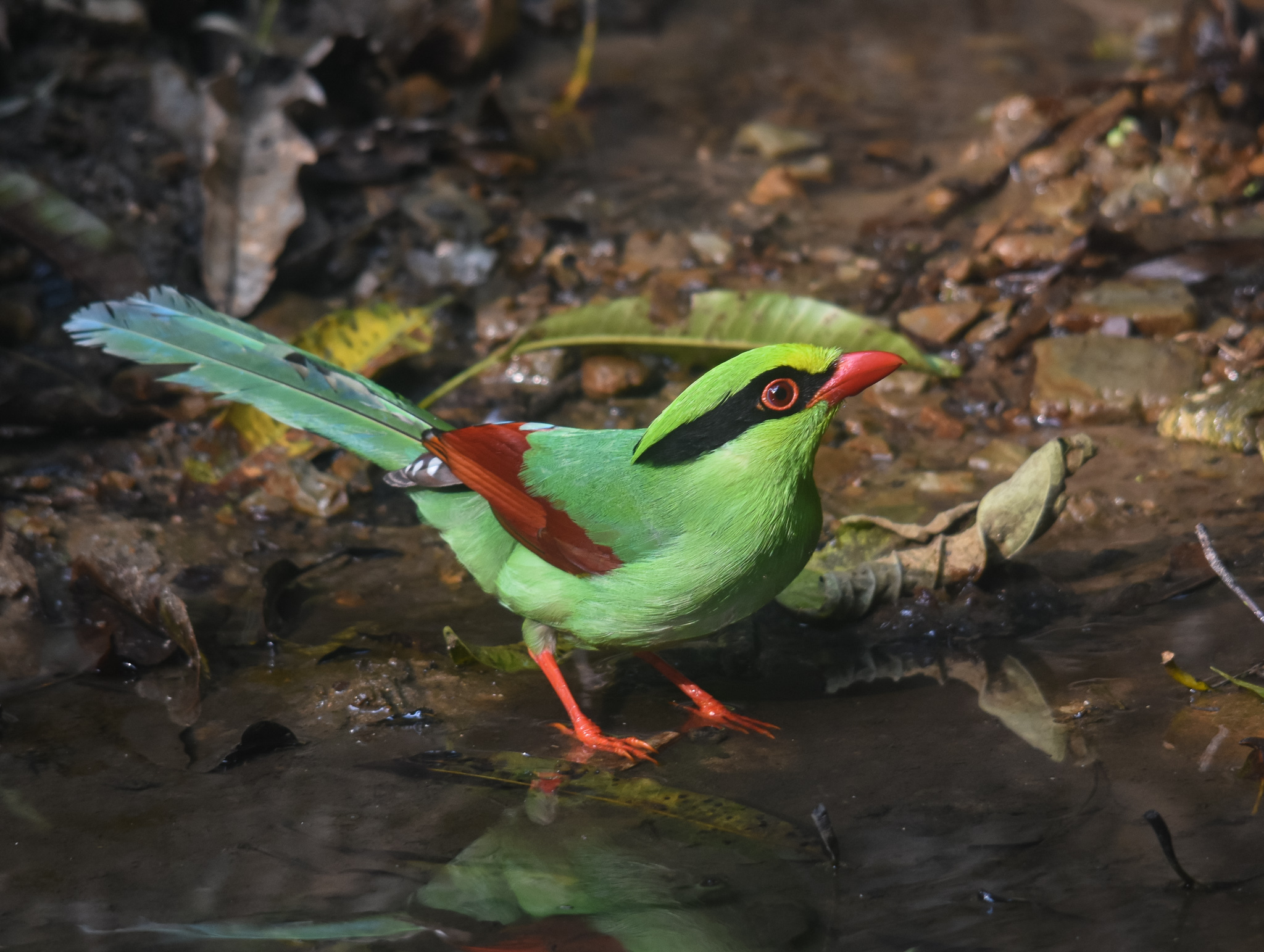
- Nominate subspecies

Conservation status
- Least Concern (IUCN 3.1)

Scientific classification
- Kingdom: Animalia
- Phylum: Chordata
- Class: Aves
- Order: Passeriformes
- Family: Corvidae
- Genus: Cissa
- Species: C. chinensis

Binomial name
- Cissa chinensis (Boddaert, 1783)
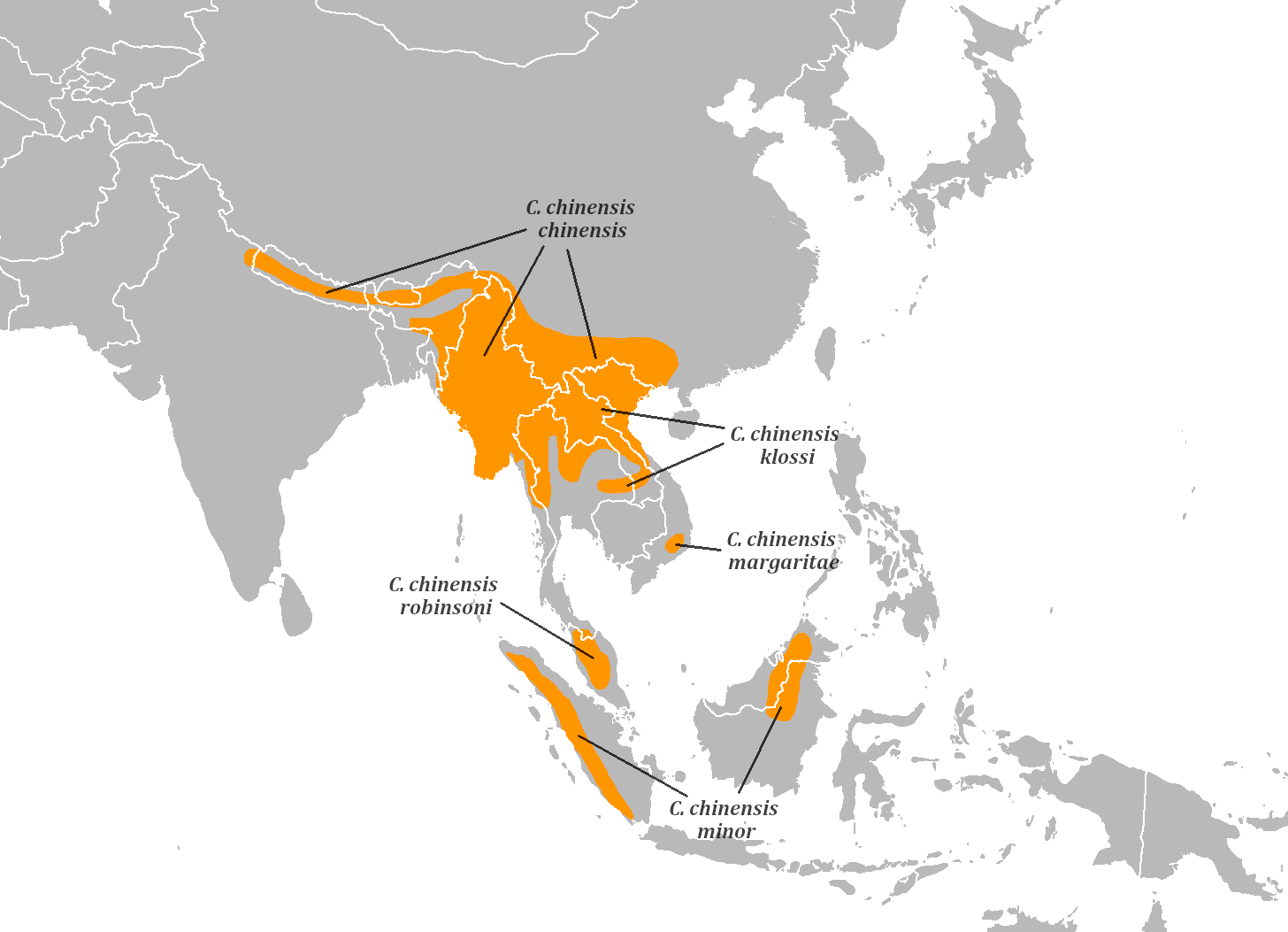
- Native distribution of the common green magpie

= Common green magpie =

Species of bird

The common green magpie (Cissa chinensis) is a member of the crow family, roughly the size of the Eurasian jay or slightly smaller. In the wild, specimens are usually a bright and lush green in colour (which often fades to turquoise in captivity or with poor diet as the pigment is carotenoid-based), slightly lighter on the underside and have a thick black stripe from the bill through the eyes to the nape. Compared to that of the other members of its genus, the white-tipped tail is quite long. This all contrasts vividly with the red fleshy eye rims, bill and legs. The wings are reddish maroon.

It is found from the lower Himalayas in north eastern India in a broad south easterly band down into central Thailand, Malaysia, Sumatra and northwestern Borneo in evergreen forest (including bamboo forest), clearings and scrub.

This bird seeks food both on the ground and in the canopy of the trees, and takes a very high percentage of animal prey from countless invertebrates, small reptiles, mammals and young birds and eggs. It will also take flesh from a recently killed carcass. They will usually feed the newborns first.

The nest is built in trees, large shrubs and often in tangles of various climbing vines. There are usually 4–6 eggs laid.

The voice is quite varied but often a harsh peep-peep. It also frequently whistles and chatters.

== Taxonomy ==
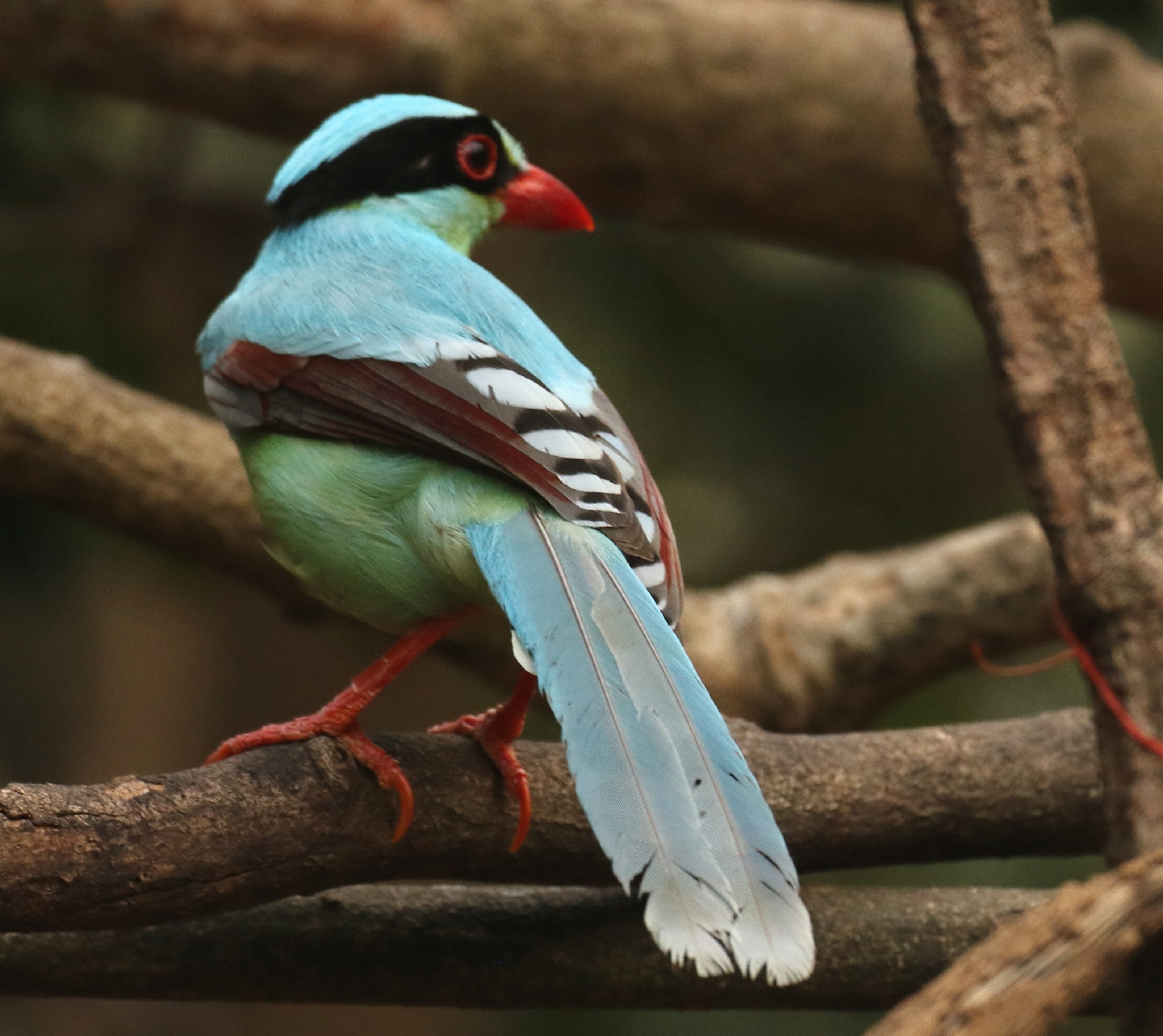
In bluish plumage due to lack of lutein, Kaeng Krachan National Park, Thailand

The common green magpie was described by the French polymath Georges-Louis Leclerc, Comte de Buffon in 1775 in his Histoire Naturelle des Oiseaux. The bird was also illustrated in a hand-coloured plate engraved by François-Nicolas Martinet in the Planches Enluminées D'Histoire Naturelle which was produced under the supervision of Edme-Louis Daubenton to accompany Buffon's text. Neither the plate caption nor Buffon's description included a scientific name but in 1783 the Dutch naturalist Pieter Boddaert coined the binomial name Coracias chinensis in his catalogue of the Planches Enluminées. Buffon believed that his specimen had come from China but the species only occurs in the extreme south of the country. The type locality was redesignated in 1952 by the German ornithologist Erwin Stresemann as Mergui, Tanintharyi Region, Myanmar.

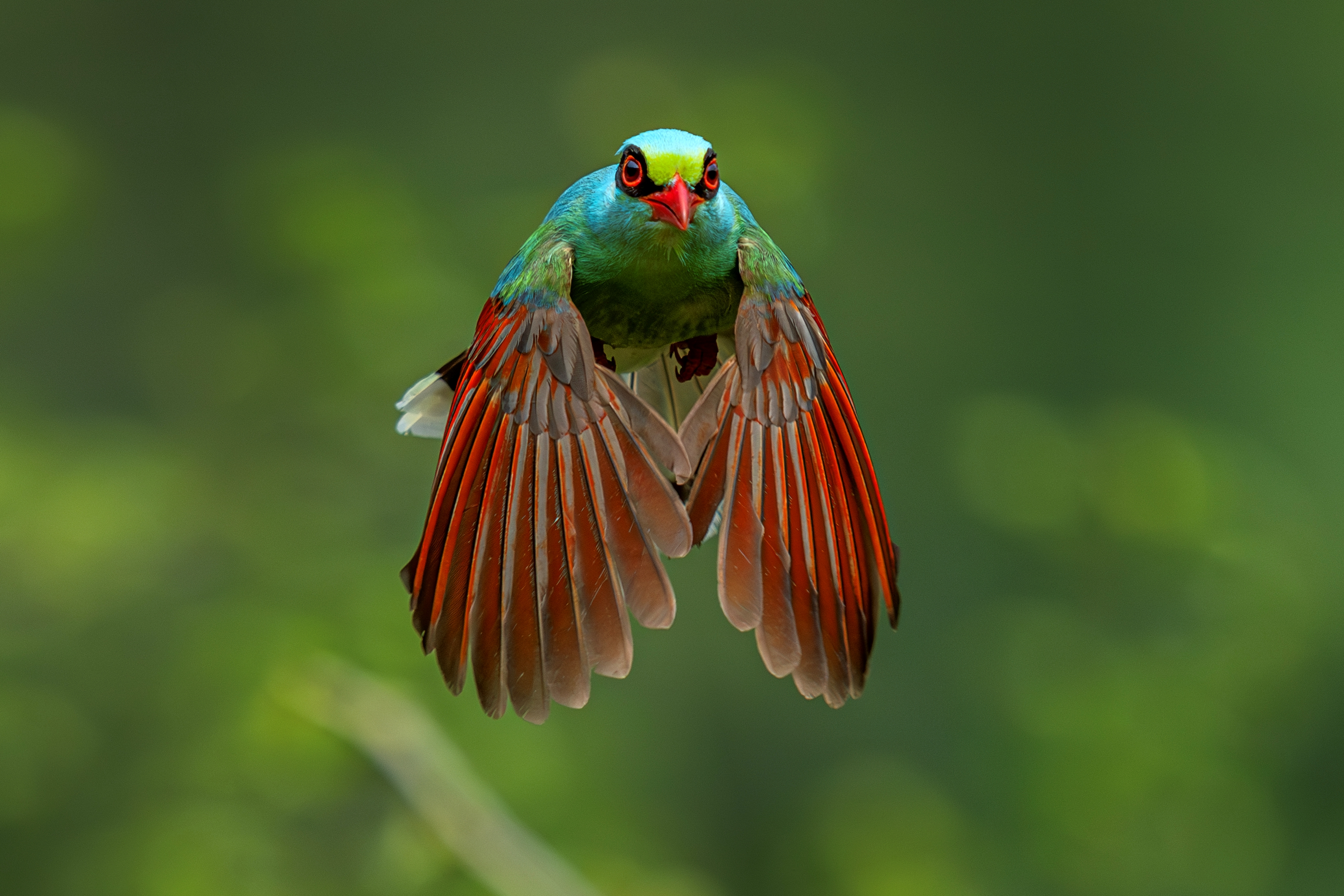
Common Green Magpie, Nepal

The common green magpie is now one of four species that are placed in the genus Cissa that was introduced by the German zoologist Friedrich Boie in 1826 with the common green magpie as the type species. The generic name is from the Ancient Greek kissa meaning a "jay" or "magpie". The specific epithet chinensis was chosen by Boddaert in the mistaken belief that the specimen illustrated by Martinet had come from China.

Five subspecies are recognised:

- C. c. chinensis (Boddaert, 1783) – Himalayas to south China, north Indochina, Thailand and Myanmar
- C. c. klossi (Delacour & Jabouille, 1924) – central Indochina
- C. c. margaritae (Robinson & Kloss, 1919) – Lang Bian Mountains (south Vietnam)
- C. c. robinsoni (Ogilvie-Grant, 1906) – Malay Peninsula
- C. c. minor (Cabanis, 1850) – Sumatra and Borneo
