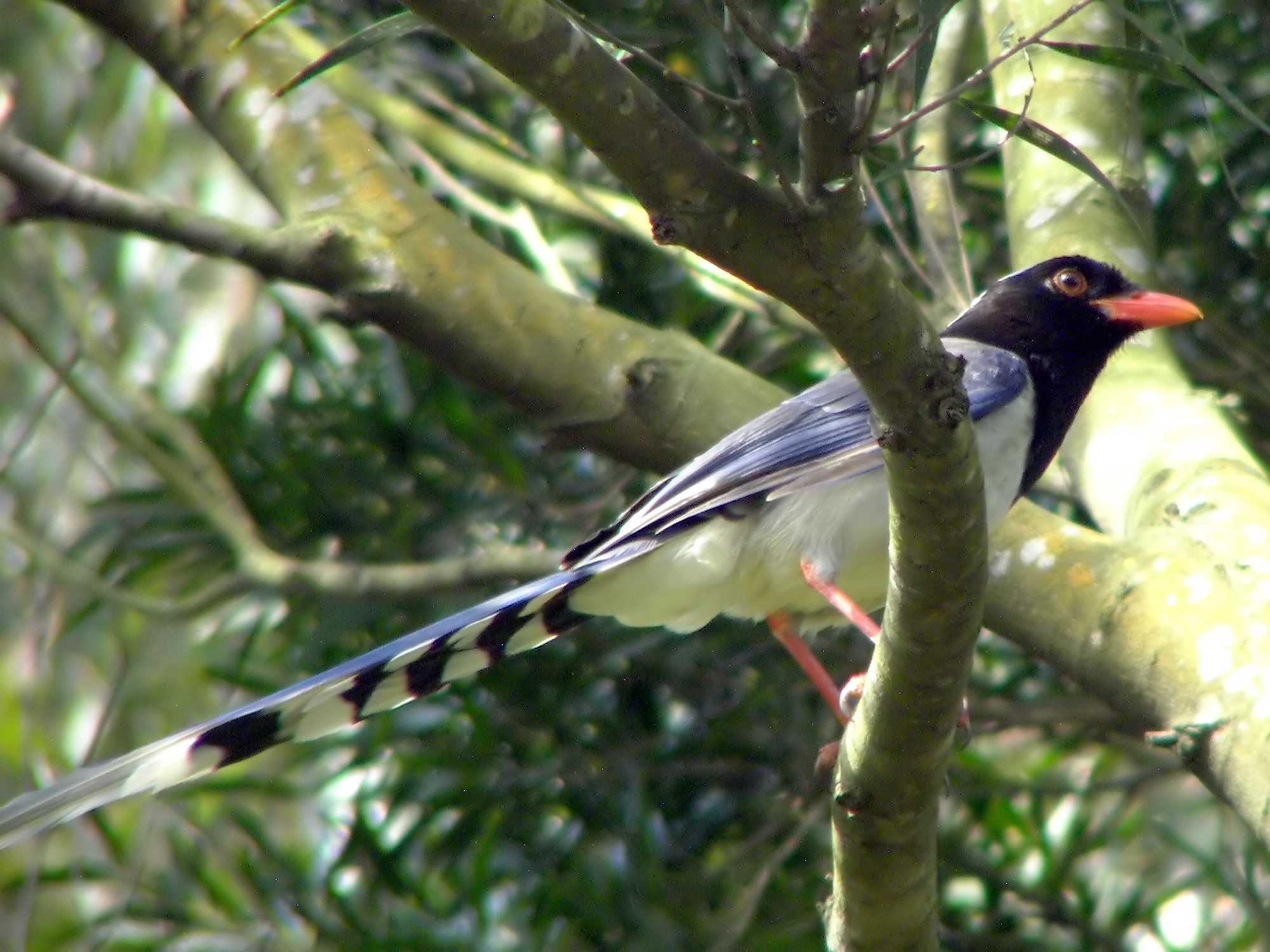
- Near Shek Kwu Lung, Hong Kong

Conservation status
- Least Concern (IUCN 3.1)

Scientific classification
- Kingdom: Animalia
- Phylum: Chordata
- Class: Aves
- Order: Passeriformes
- Family: Corvidae
- Genus: Urocissa
- Species: U. erythroryncha

Binomial name
- Urocissa erythroryncha (Boddaert, 1783)
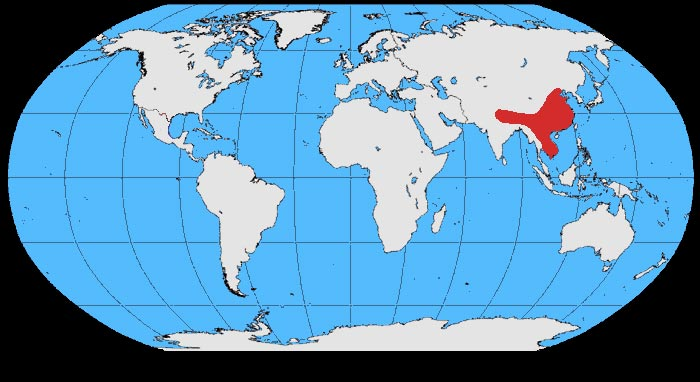

= Red-billed blue magpie =

Species of bird

The red-billed blue magpie (Urocissa erythroryncha) is a species of bird (magpie) in the crow family, Corvidae. It is about the same size as the Eurasian magpie, but has a much longer tail, one of the longest of any corvid. It is 65–68 cm (25.5–27 in) long and weighs 196–232 g (6.9–8.2 oz).

== Taxonomy ==
The red-billed blue magpie was described by French polymath Georges-Louis Leclerc, Comte de Buffon in 1775 in his Histoire Naturelle des Oiseaux. The bird was also illustrated in a hand-coloured plate engraved by François-Nicolas Martinet in the Planches Enluminées D'Histoire Naturelle which was produced under the supervision of Edme-Louis Daubenton to accompany Buffon's text. Neither the plate caption nor Buffon's description included a scientific name, but in 1783, Dutch naturalist Pieter Boddaert coined the binomial name Corvus erythrorynchus in his catalogue of the Planches Enluminées. The specimen described by Buffon had come from China, but the type location was restricted to Canton by Hugh Birckhead in 1937. The red-billed blue magpie is now one of five species placed in the genus Urocissa that was introduced by German ornithologist Jean Cabanis in 1850. The name of the genus combines the Ancient Greek oura meaning "tail" and kissa meaning "magpie". The specific epithet erythroryncha combines the Ancient Greek eruthros meaning "red" and rhunkhos meaning "bill".

Five subspecies are recognised:

- U. e. occipitalis (Blyth, 1846) – northwest India to east Nepal
- U. e. magnirostris (Blyth, 1846) – northeast India to south Indochina
- U. e. alticola Birckhead, 1938 – north Myanmar and south-central China
- U. e. brevivexilla R. Swinhoe, 1874 – northeast China
- U. e. erythroryncha (Boddaert, 1783) – central, east, and southeast China, north Indochina

== Description ==
The head, neck, and breast are black with a bluish spotting on the crown. The shoulders and rump are a duller violet-blue, and the underparts are a greyish cream. The long tail is a brighter violet-blue (as are the wing primaries) with a broad, white tip. The bill is a bright orange-red, as are the legs and feet and a ring around each eye. This red can vary across its range to almost yellow in some birds.

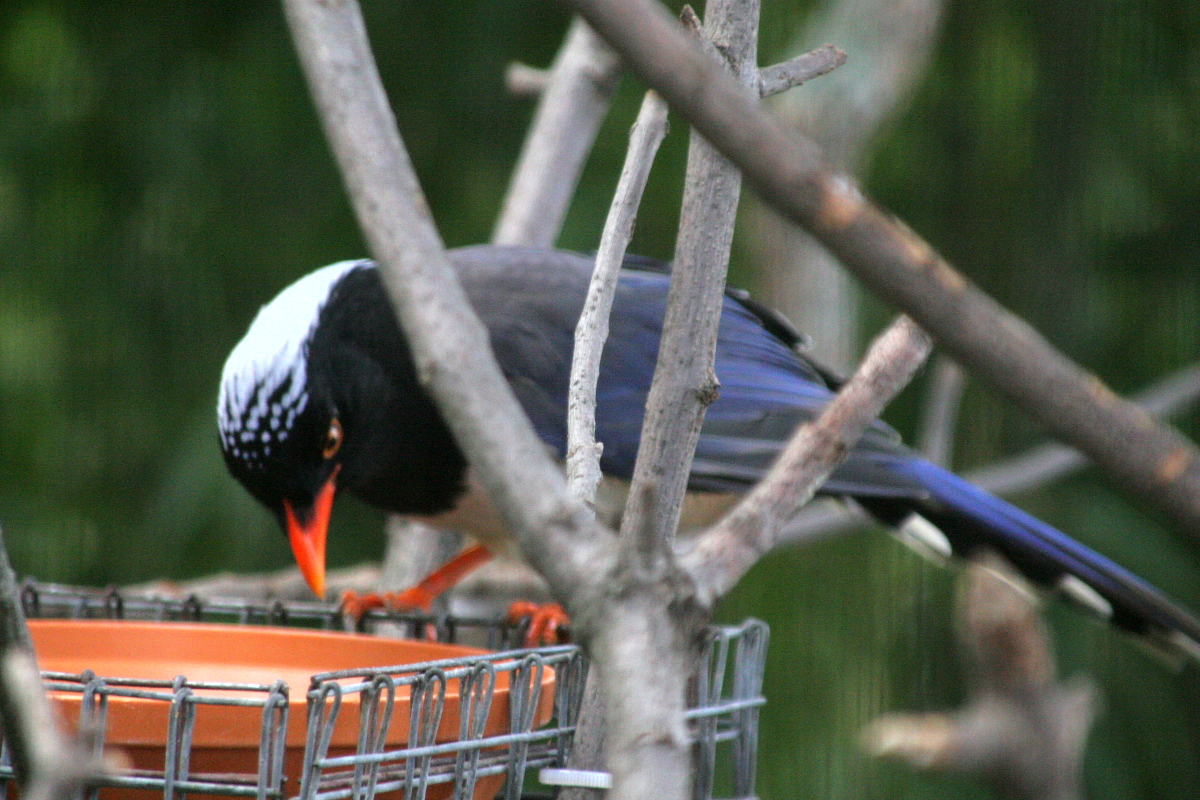
Red-billed blue magpie

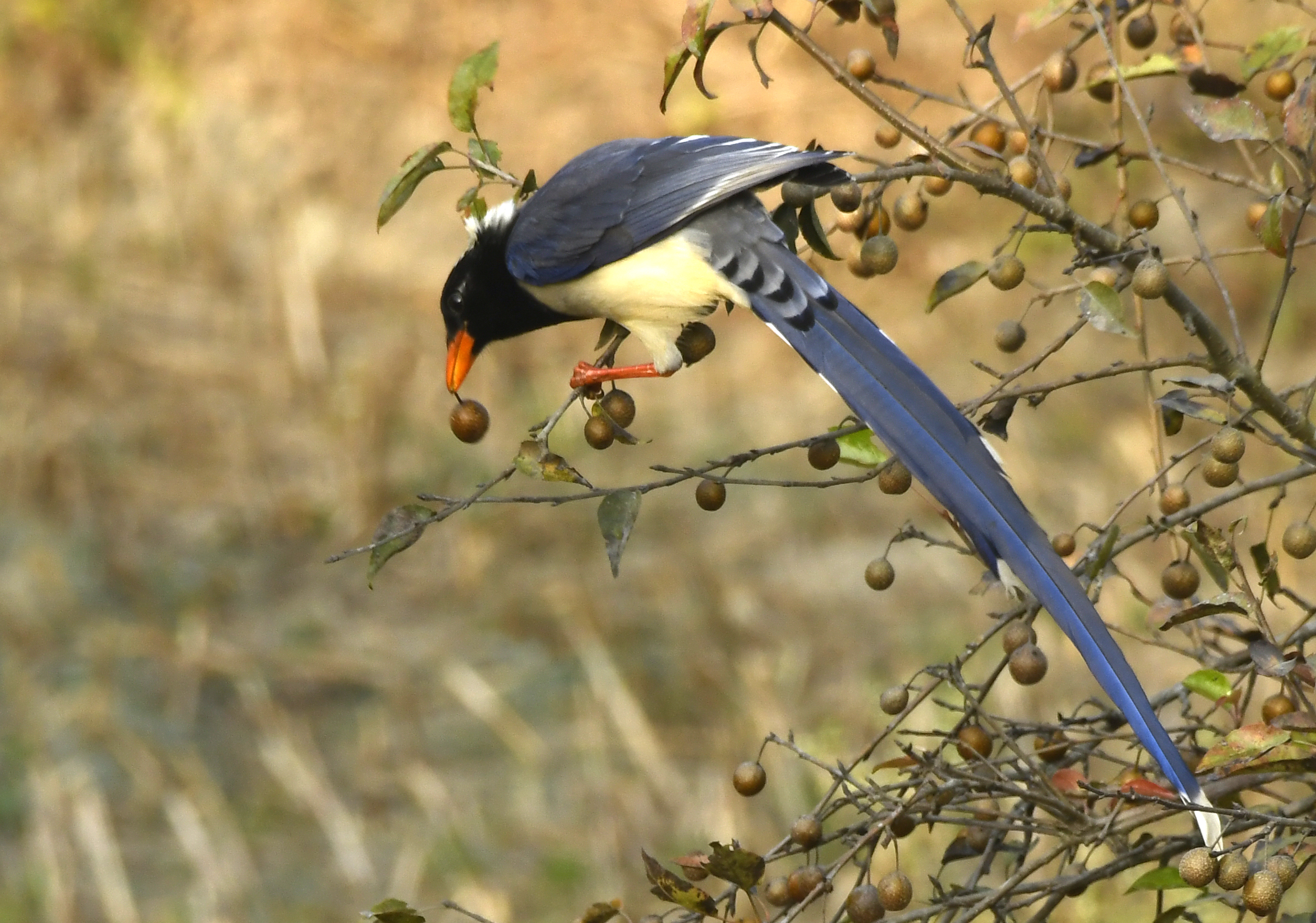
Feeding in Uttarakhand, India

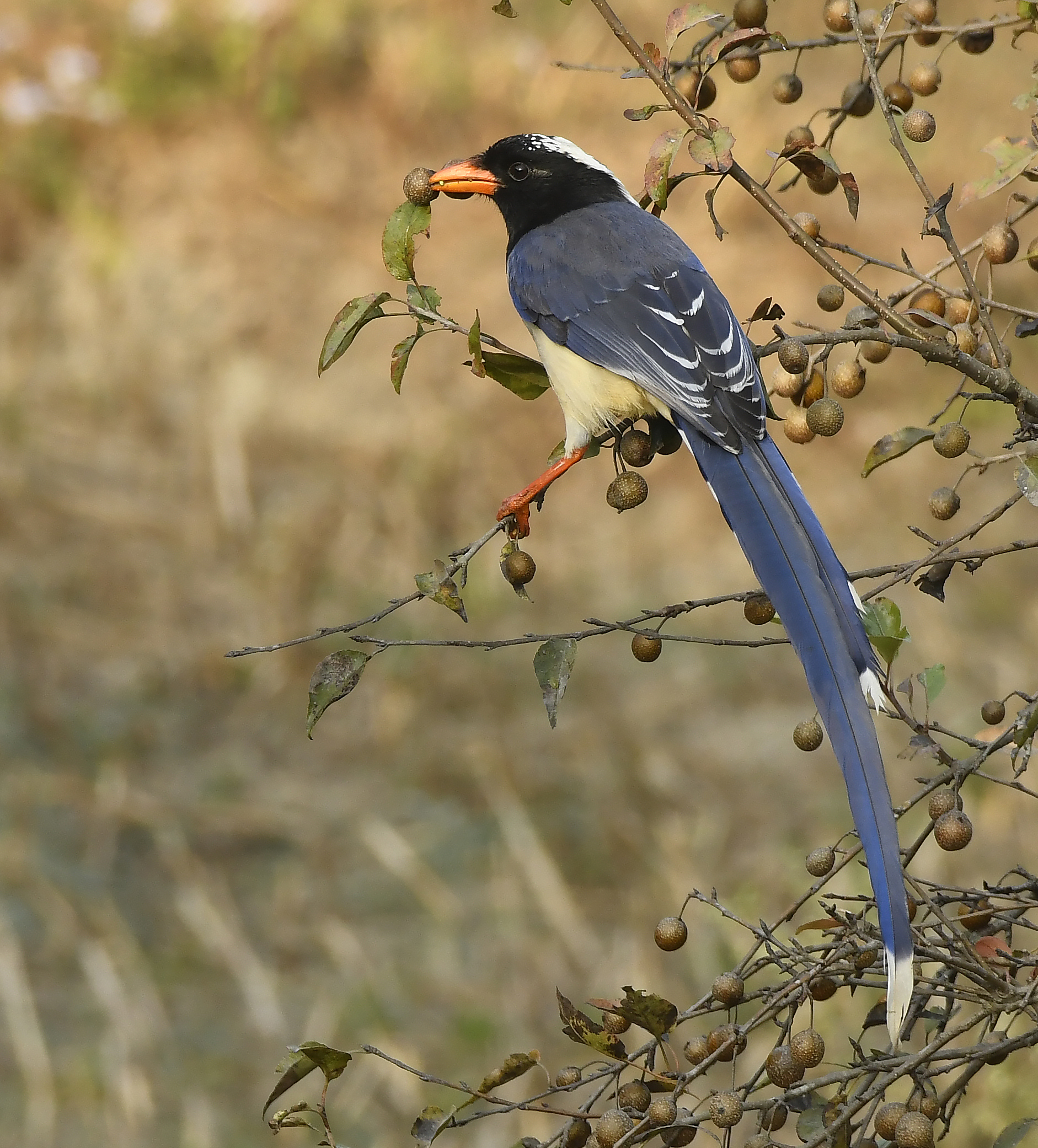
In Uttarakhand, India

== Habits and habitat ==
The red-billed blue magpie occurs in a broad swath from the northern parts of the Indian subcontinent, and further eastwards. It ranges from the western Himalayas eastwards into Myanmar, Thailand, Cambodia, Laos, and Vietnam, and through central and eastern China to southwest Manchuria, in evergreen forest and scrub in predominantly hilly or mountainous country. It has adapted to urban habitat, and can be seen in large cities in China such as Beijing and Hong Kong. They nest in trees and large shrubs in a relatively shallow nest. Usually, three to five eggs are laid.

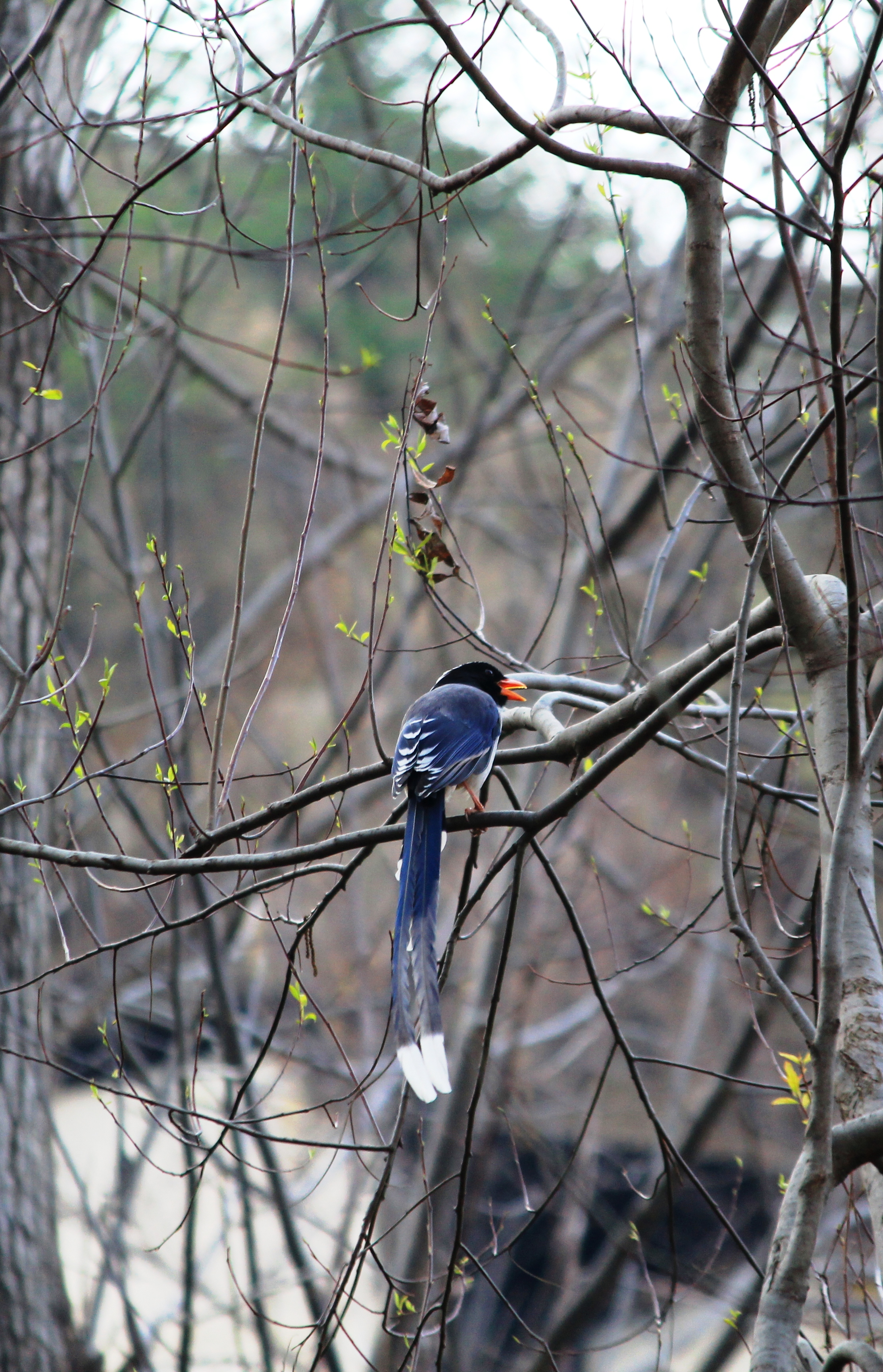
Red-billed blue magpie in Shimla Water Catchment Wildlife Sanctuary H.P.

Food is sought both in trees and on the ground. It takes the usual wide range of food, such as invertebrates, other small animals, and fruit and some seeds. It robs nests of eggs and also chicks. Vocal mimicry is very apparent in this species, and its calls are very varied, but the most usual are a grating rattle and a high-pitched whistle somewhat like a flute.
