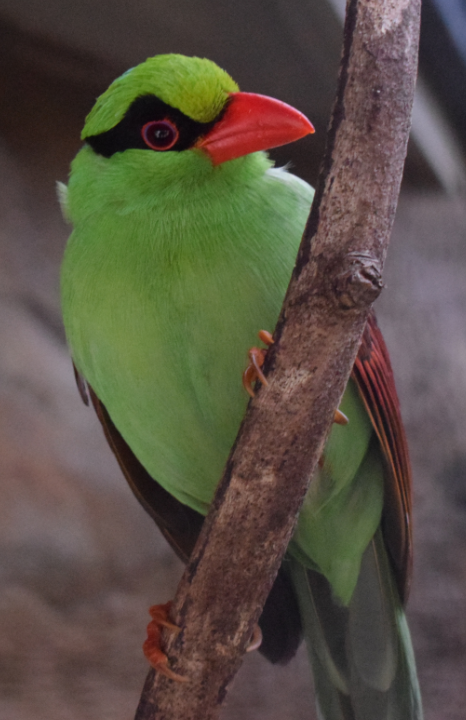
- Individual at Chester Zoo

Conservation status
- Critically Endangered (IUCN 3.1)

Scientific classification
- Kingdom: Animalia
- Phylum: Chordata
- Class: Aves
- Order: Passeriformes
- Family: Corvidae
- Genus: Cissa
- Species: C. thalassina

Binomial name
- Cissa thalassina (Temminck, 1826)

= Javan green magpie =

Species of bird

The Javan green magpie (Cissa thalassina) is a passerine bird in the crow family, Corvidae, endemic to montane forests on the island of Western Java, Indonesia. This critically endangered species was once more widespread, but it has suffered significant population declines due to habitat loss and illegal capture for the wild animal trade.

Once common, it is now found in only four protected areas, with estimates of the remaining wild population being as low as 50 individuals. While others speculate that the lack of recent sightings might mean that it already is extinct in the wild.

In an attempt at saving the species, the Javan green magpie has been part of a captive breeding program since 2011. A captive breeding program based on confiscated individuals has been initiated by the Cikananga Wildlife Center in Java and a few European EAZA zoos starting in 2015. It has successfully bred at both the Javan and European facilities, and as of 2018 this captive population had reached about 50 individuals.

It formerly included the Bornean green magpie as a subspecies, in which case the "combined" species was known as the short-tailed magpie.

== Description ==
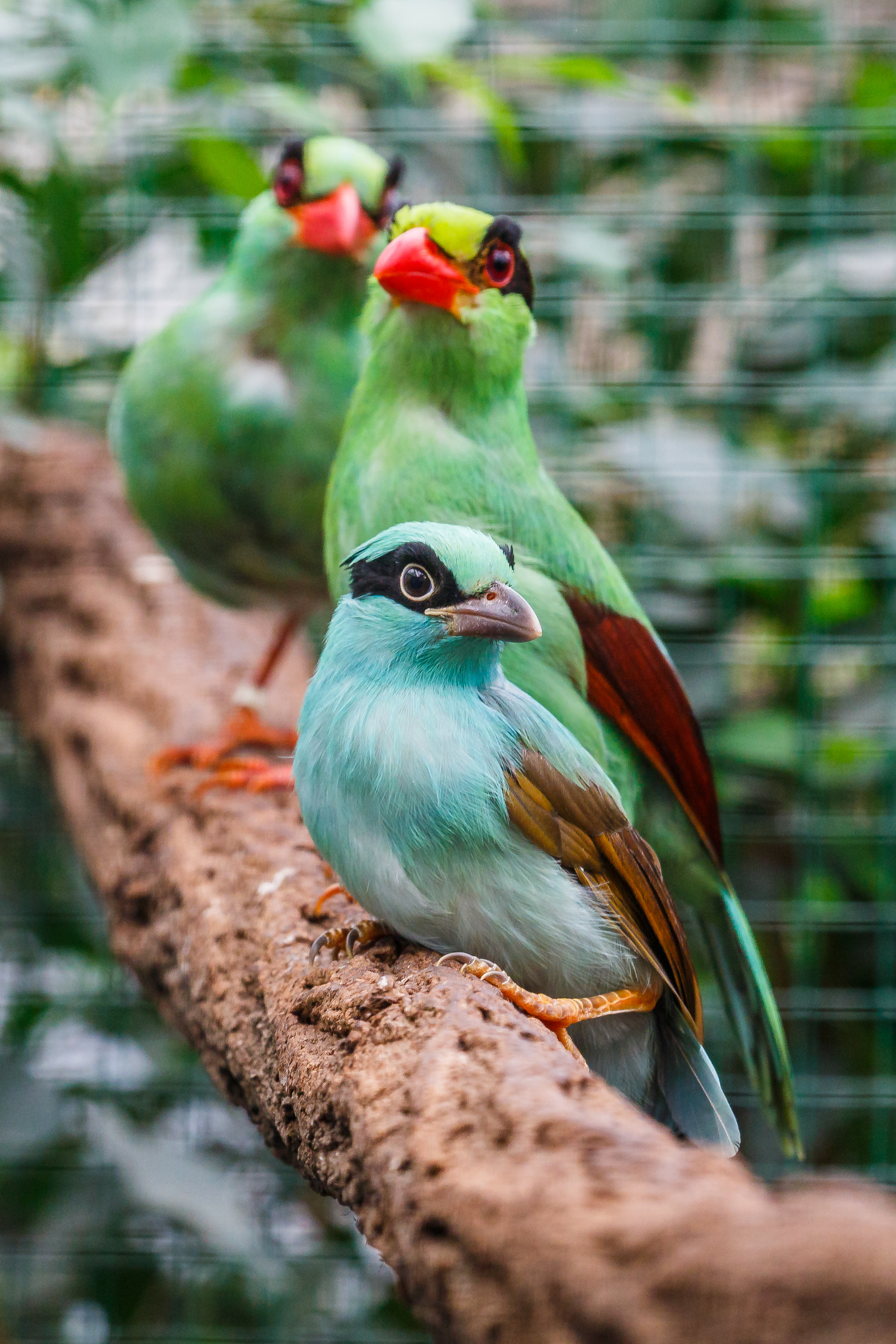
A pair and their dark-beaked young at Prague Zoo, a part of the EAZA breeding program

The Javan green magpie has a green crown and underparts, with a black "mask" marking around the dark brown eyes, russet wings and white tertiary feathers. It has bright red beaks and eyerings; its legs are equally bright, ranging from red to orange. Its body is 31–33 cm (12–13 in) long, and it has a 97–110 mm (3.8–4.3 in) short, bluntly graduated tail.

== Distribution and habitat ==
The Javan green magpie is restricted to a small range in western Java, where it has been recorded in Mount Merapi National Park, Mount Halimun Salak National Park, Mount Gede Pangrango National Park and South Parahyangan Practice Forest and Nature Reserve.

These areas are located predominantly in montane forests and foothills at elevations between 500 and 2,000 m (1,600 and 6,600 ft). While the bird prefers higher altitudes, it is occasionally seen in lower land areas and at the edges of forests. The surrounding region includes tea gardens, where the Javan green magpie is known to occasionally raid these gardens for food.

== Behaviour and ecology ==
The Javan green magpie feeds primarily on invertebrates, including snails, crustaceans, isopods, scarab beetles, and other insects. During the breeding season, the bird has been observed feeding on small vertebrates, such as lizards, smaller birds, eggs, frogs, and even snakes. This diverse diet supports the bird's energetic lifestyle and is particularly important during the breeding period. It also feeds on small lizards and frogs.

== Reproduction ==
The breeding habits of the Javan green magpie are still not fully understood, but it is thought to breed throughout much of the year, particularly during the rainy season. Nests are typically built in trees using thin twigs, bamboo, and large leaves, located 2-3 meters above the ground. These nests are often in areas with thin branches, making them vulnerable to poaching. The magpies typically lay one or two eggs, which are smooth and glossy with a pale yellow or off-white color, marked with reddish or yellow streaks.

Javan green magpies lay cream coloured speckled eggs and are altricial, hatching with no feathers, completely dependant on their parents. A fledgeling's initial plumage is bluish, with the dark face and wing markings. They have beige-brown beaks and eyerings with light orange legs. They become green after their first moult.

== Conservation ==
The Javan green magpie faces significant conservation challenges, largely due to its popularity in the illegal pet trade and the international parrot trade. In Indonesia, wild-caught birds are commonly captured for sale in the pet market, and the species' striking appearance has made it highly sought after. This illegal trade has contributed to a severe population decline.

In response, conservation efforts are being made to protect the species. Habitat surveys and long-term monitoring programs are ongoing to assess viable habitats and guide future conservation efforts. In 2021, the Cikananga Wildlife Center launched a survey to evaluate these habitats and help ensure the species' survival. Efforts to breed the species in captivity, as well as habitat protection, are key to maintaining the Javan green magpie population and preventing further declines.
