= Pieter Boddaert =

Dutch physician and naturalist

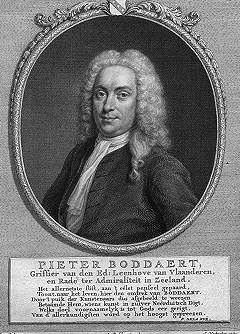
- Born: 1730; Middelburg, Zeeland, Dutch Republic
- Died: 6 May 1795 (aged 64–65); Utrecht, Utrecht, Netherlands
- Education: Utrecht University
- Known for: Elenchus Animalium
- Scientific career
- Fields: Physician, Natural history
- Workplaces: University of Utrecht
- Author abbrev. (zoology): Bodd.

Pieter Boddaert (Dutch pronunciation: [ˈpitər ˈbɔdaːrt]; 1730 – 6 May 1795) was a Dutch physician and naturalist.

== Early life, family and education ==
Boddaert was the son of a Middelburg jurist and poet by the same name (1694–1760). The younger Pieter obtained his M.D. at the University of Utrecht in 1764.

== Career ==
He became a lecturer on natural history at his alma mater, University of Utrecht. Fourteen letters survive of his correspondence with Carl Linnaeus between 1768 and 1775. He was a friend of Albert Schlosser, whose cabinet of "curiosities" of natural history he described.

In 1783 he published 50 copies of an identification key of Edmé-Louis Daubenton's Planches enluminées, the colored plates of illustrations for the comte de Buffon's monumental Histoire Naturelle (published 1749–1789), assigning binomial scientific names to the plates. As many of these were the first Linnaean scientific names to be proposed, they remain in use. In 2017 the world list of birds maintained by Frank Gill and David Donsker on behalf of the International Ornithologists' Union included 190 taxa for which Boddaert is cited as the authority. Of these 112 are treated as species and 78 as subspecies. One species, the hoopoe starling, is now extinct.

In 1784 he published Elenchus Animalium, a "directory of animals" that included the first binomial names for a number of mammals, including the Quagga and the Tarpan.

== Honors and awards ==
Boddaert is commemorated in the scientific name of a species of South American snake, Mastigodryas boddaerti.
