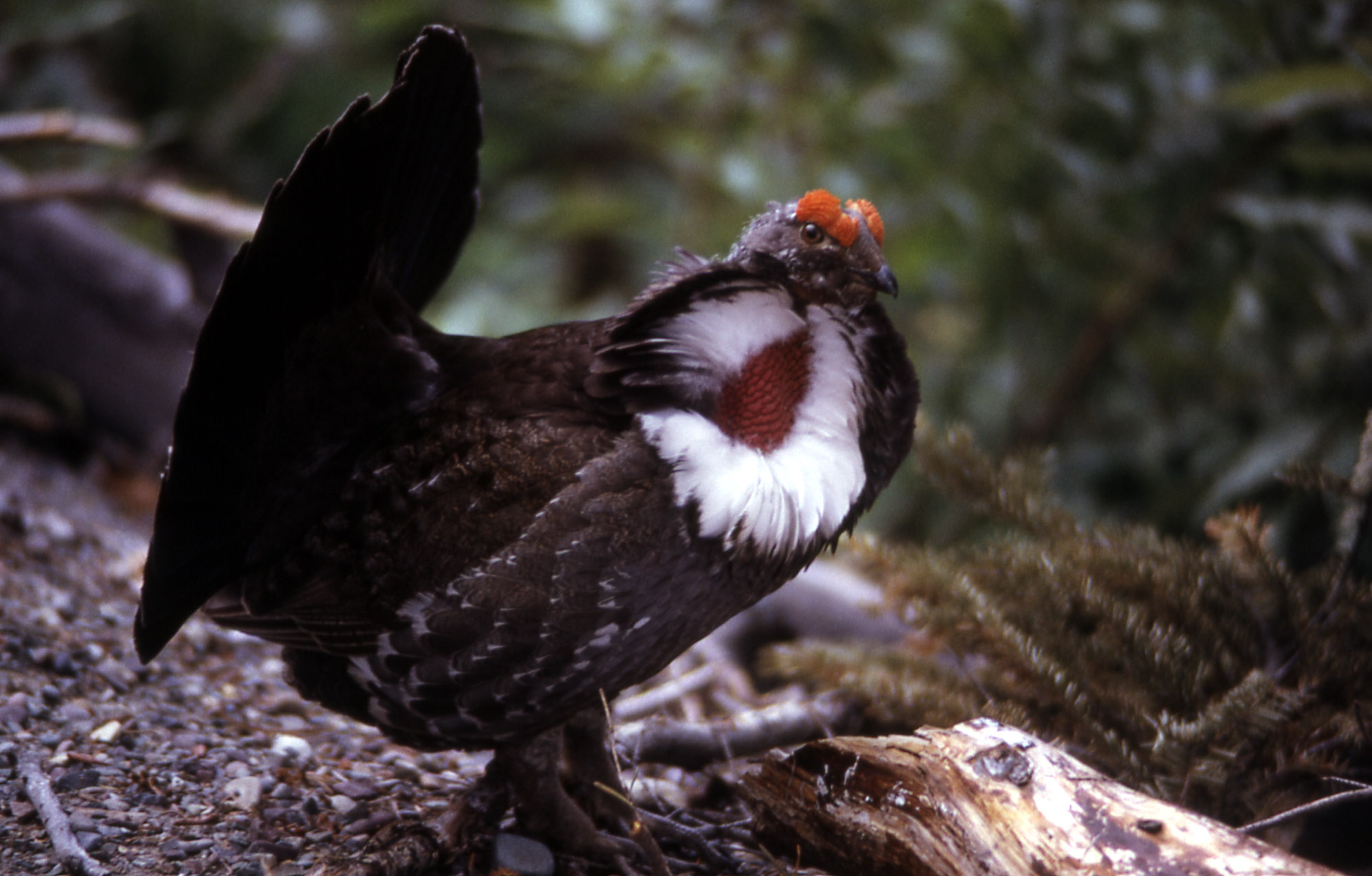
- Male displaying, Yellowstone National Park
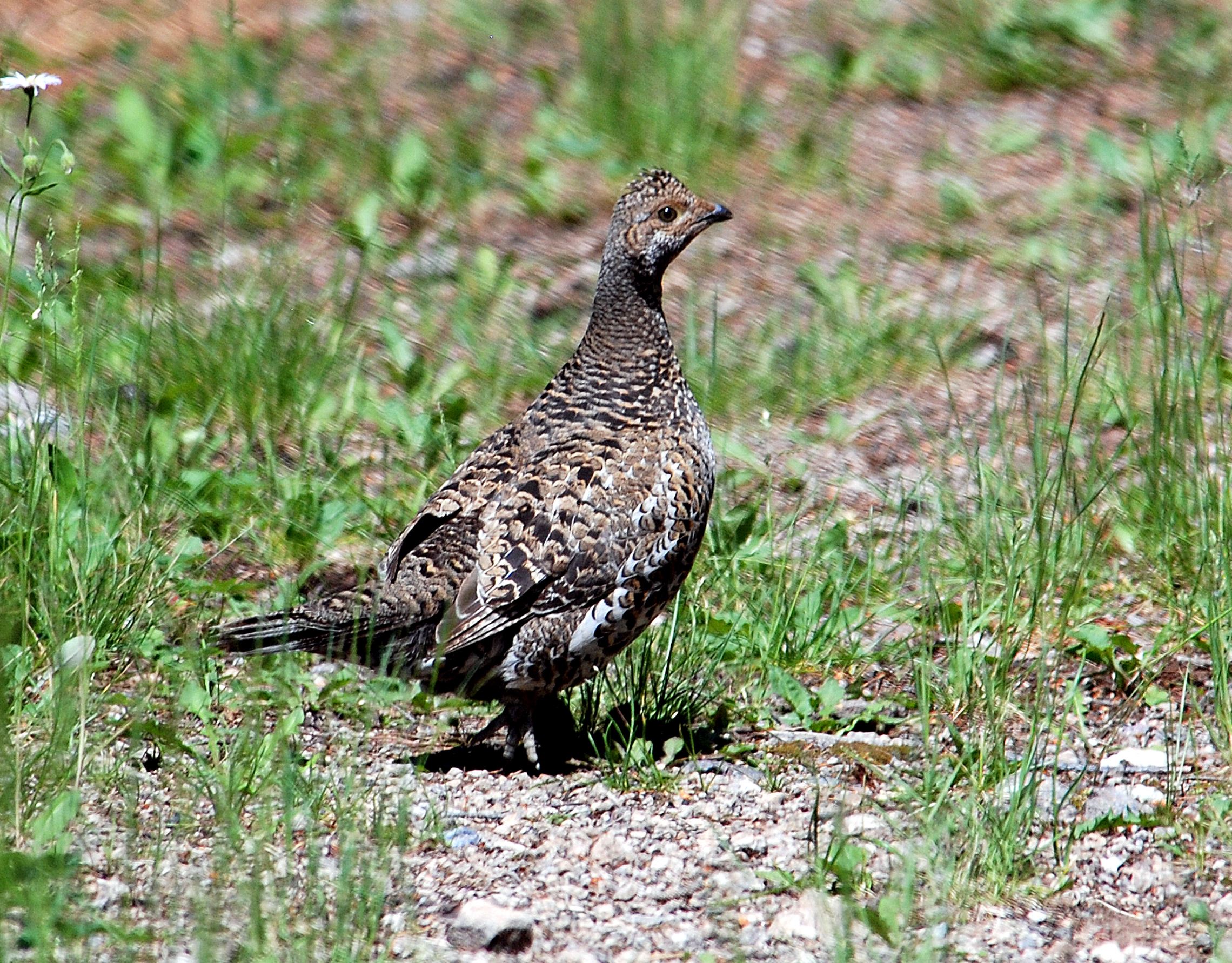
- Female in New Mexico, USA

Conservation status
- Least Concern (IUCN 3.1)

Scientific classification
- Kingdom: Animalia
- Phylum: Chordata
- Class: Aves
- Order: Galliformes
- Family: Phasianidae
- Genus: Dendragapus
- Species: D. obscurus

Binomial name
- Dendragapus obscurus (Say, 1822)

= Dusky grouse =

Species of bird

The dusky grouse (Dendragapus obscurus) is a species of forest-dwelling grouse native to the Rocky Mountains in North America. It is closely related to the sooty grouse (Dendragapus fuliginosus), and the two were previously considered a single species, the blue grouse.

== Description ==
Adults have a long square tail, gray at the end. Adult males are mainly dark with a purplish throat air sac surrounded by white, and a yellow to red wattle over the eye during display. Adult females are mottled brown with dark brown and white marks on the underparts.

Males are larger than females, with a male mean body mass of 1.21 kg (2.67 lbs.) compared to a mean 0.91 kg (2.01 lbs.) in females.

== Distribution and habitat ==
The breeding habitat of the dusky grouse is the edges of conifer and mixed forests in mountainous regions of western North America, from southeastern Alaska and Yukon south to New Mexico. Their range is closely associated with that of various conifers. Their nest is a scrape on the ground concealed under a shrub or log.

== Taxonomy ==
The dusky grouse has four recognized subspecies:

- D. o. obscurus (Say, 1822)
- D. o. oreinus (Behle & Selander, 1951)
- D. o. pallidus (Swarth, 1931)
- D. o. richardsonii (Douglas, 1829)

== Migration ==
They are permanent residents but move short distances by foot and short flights to denser forest areas in winter, with the odd habit of moving to higher altitudes in winter.

== Diet ==
Dusky grouse forage mainly for plant matter on the ground, as well as in trees and along branches (in the winter). During the coldest months, they mainly eat fir and douglas-fir needles, occasionally consuming hemlock and pine needles, as well. Then, in the spring and summer, the fresh green growth of various herbaceous perennials (Pteridium, Salix) and berry plants (Gaultheria, Mahonia, Rubus, Vaccinium), as well as invertebrates (particularly larger ants, beetles, crickets and grasshoppers), become more available and thus more readily consumed. Chicks are almost entirely dependent on insect prey for several weeks after hatching.

== Breeding ==
Males sing with deep hoots on their territory and make short flapping flights to attract females. Females leave the male's territory after mating.

Females make a shallow nest 17 cm (6.7 in) across and 4.6 cm (1.8 in) deep. The clutch can range from one to twelve eggs, each measuring 4.8–5 cm (1.9–2.0 in) long and 3.3–3.5 cm (1.3–1.4 in) in width. Young are born precocial and can follow their mother.

Male Dusky Grouse displaying for a Female, Jemez Mtns., New Mexico
