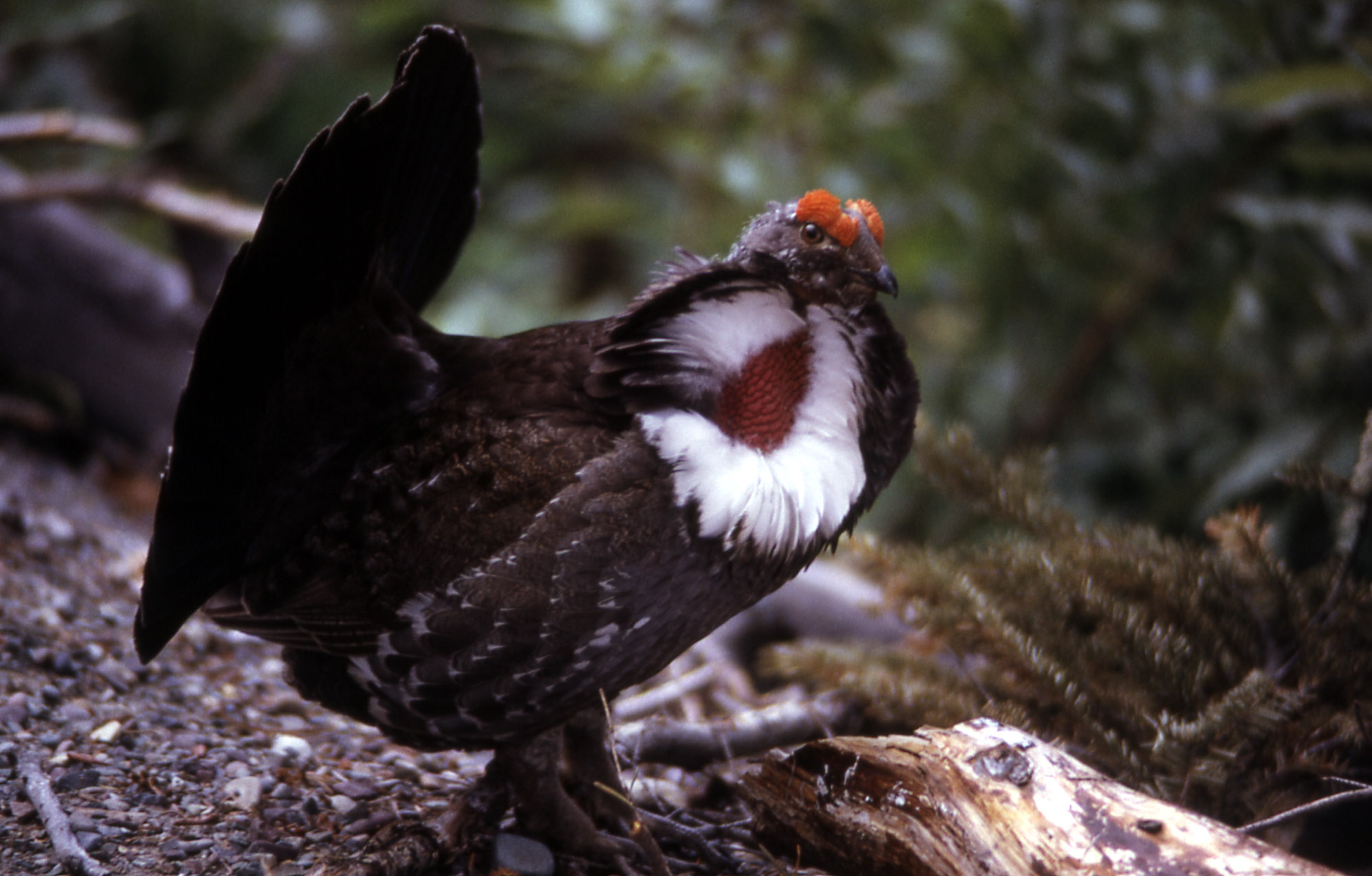
- Male dusky grouse displaying, Yellowstone NP; note purple air sac and red eye wattle.

Scientific classification
- Kingdom: Animalia
- Phylum: Chordata
- Class: Aves
- Order: Galliformes
- Family: Phasianidae
- Tribe: Tetraonini
- Genus: Dendragapus; Elliot, 1864

Type species
- Tetrao obscurus

Species
- Dusky grouse Dendragapus obscurus Sooty grouse Dendragapus fuliginosus

Synonyms
- Palaeotetrix

= Dendragapus =

Genus of birds

The genus Dendragapus contains two closely related species of grouse that have often been treated as a single variable taxon (blue grouse). The two species are the dusky grouse (Dendragapus obscurus) and the sooty grouse (Dendragapus fuliginosus). In addition, the spruce grouse and Siberian grouse have been considered part of this genus.

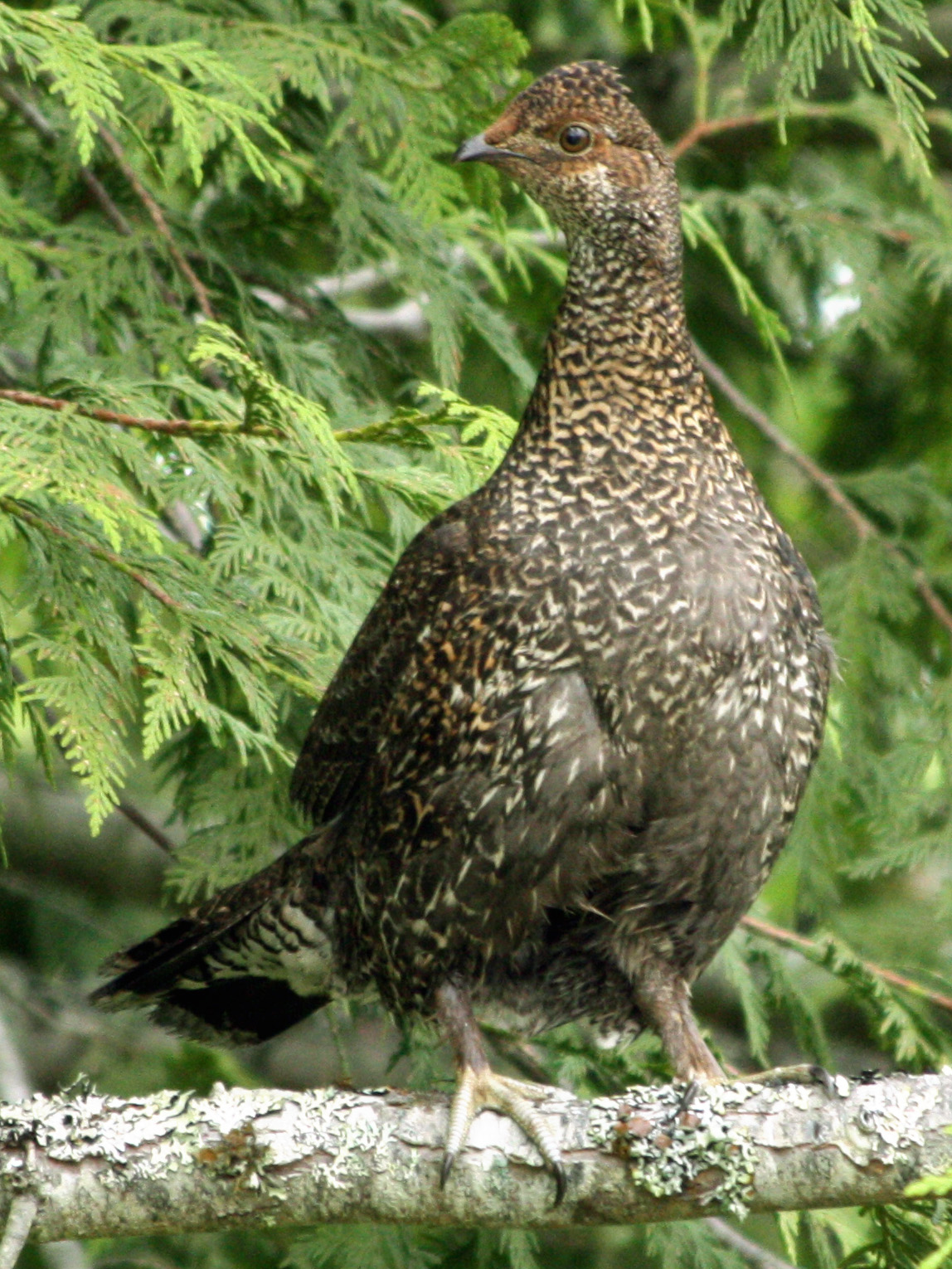
Females of both species (sooty grouse pictured) are mottled brown with dark brown and white marks on the underparts.

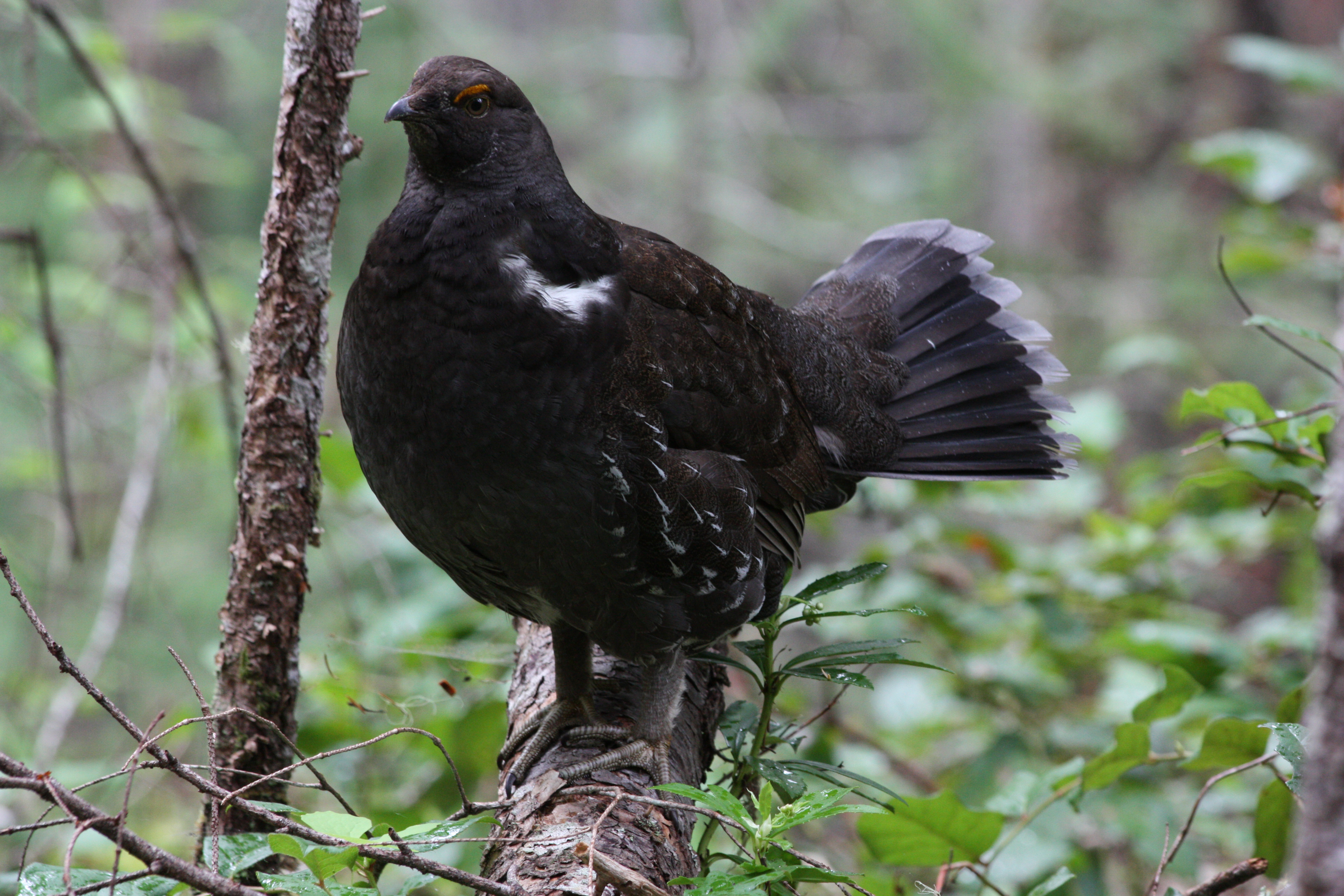
In breeding plumage, this sooty grouse male is typical of the species. It is dark grey with a yellow wattle over the eye. The tail is long and black with a square pale gray tip.

== Description ==
These are large grouse that inhabit highland regions of North America and Eurasia. The sooty grouse is found in the Pacific Coast Ranges and Sierra Nevada, and the dusky grouse in the Rocky Mountains. These two taxa were originally regarded as separate species, but were considered conspecific for much of the twentieth century. However, in 2006 the American Ornithologists' Union re-split them, following the DNA-based work of Barrowclough et al. (2004). whose results supported the earlier work of Brooks (1929) who regarded the two taxa as separate species based on morphology, behavior and vocalizations. The precise ranges of the two species are well-defined in the south, separated by extensive areas of unsuitable forest-free habitat, but somewhat uncertain in the north of the range of the genus where there is no separation; Barrowclough et al.'s study did not include these northern populations.

Adults have a long square tail, gray at the end (lighter in the sooty grouse). Adult males are mainly dark (especially sooty grouse) with a yellow (sooty grouse) or purplish (dusky grouse) throat air sac surrounded by white, and a yellow (sooty grouse) or yellow-to-red (dusky grouse) wattle over the eye during display. Adult females of both species are mottled brown with dark brown and white marks on the underparts.

Their breeding habitat is the edges of conifer and mixed forests in mountainous regions of North America and Eurasia. Their range is closely associated with that of various conifers. The nest is a scrape on the ground concealed under a shrub or log.

All species have healthy populations, except for some population decline and habitat loss of the sooty grouse at the southern end of its range in southern California, and the Siberian grouse which is considered near-threatened.

== Species ==
=== Extant Species ===
Genus Dendragapus – Elliot, 1864 – two species
Common name	Scientific name and subspecies	Range	Size and ecology	IUCN status and estimated population
Dusky grouse Male Female	Dendragapus obscurus (Say, 1822) Four subspecies: D. o. obscurus (Say, 1822); D. o. oreinus (Behle & Selander, 1951); D. o. pallidus (Swarth, 1931); D. o. richardsonii (Douglas, 1829)	the Rocky Mountains in North America	Size: Habitat: Diet:	LC
Sooty grouse Male Female	Dendragapus fuliginosus (Ridgway, 1873) Four subspecies: D. f. fuliginosus (Ridgway, 1873); D. f. howardi (Dickey & Van Rossem, 1923); D. f. sierrae (Chapman, 1904); D. f. sitkensis (Swarth, 1921)	from southeastern Alaska and Yukon south to California	Size: Habitat: Diet:	LC

=== Fossils ===
Two Late Pleistocene fossil species have been described:

- Dendragapus gilli (Shufeldt, 1892) (western and west-central US), initially placed in a distinct genus Palaeotetrix
- Dendragapus lucasi (Shufeldt, 1892) (known only from Fossil Lake, US).
