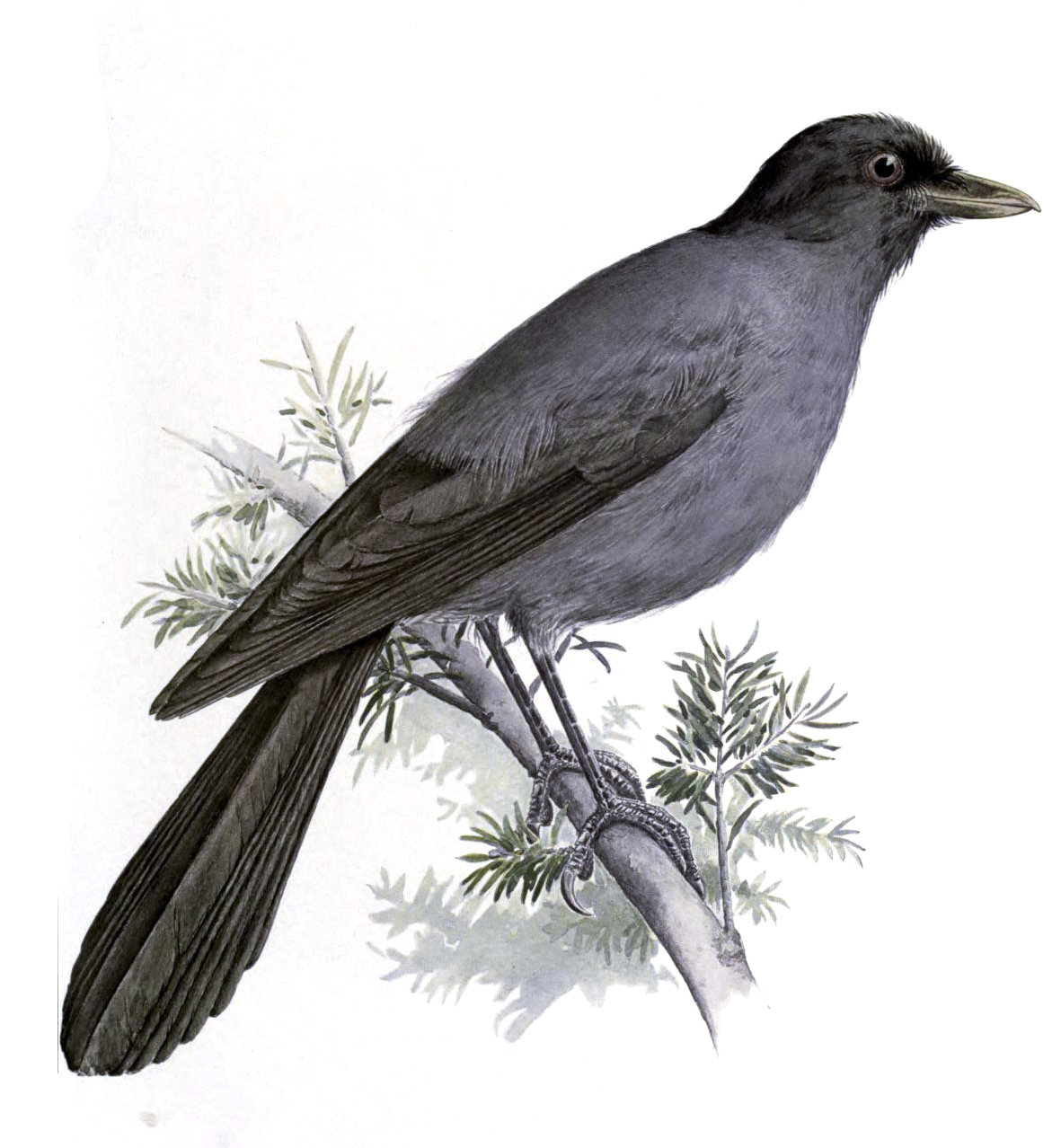

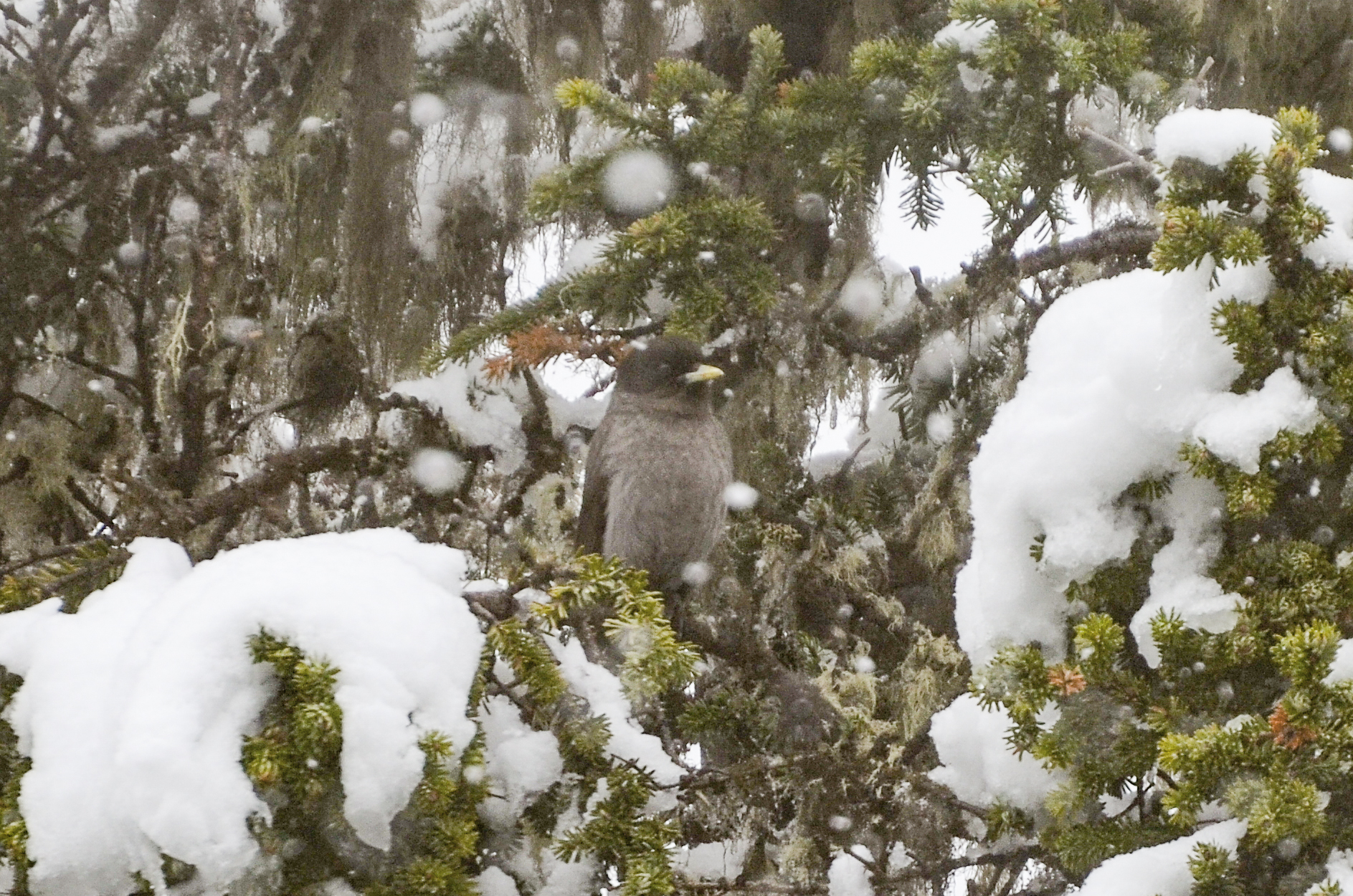

Conservation status
- Near Threatened (IUCN 3.1)

Scientific classification
- Kingdom: Animalia
- Phylum: Chordata
- Class: Aves
- Order: Passeriformes
- Family: Corvidae
- Genus: Perisoreus
- Species: P. internigrans

Binomial name
- Perisoreus internigrans (Thayer & Bangs, 1912)

= Sichuan jay =

Species of bird

The Sichuan jay (Perisoreus internigrans) is a species of bird in the family Corvidae. It is endemic to southwestern China, found in a limited distribution of coniferous, high-altitude forests. Its plumage is overall black, making it hard to observe in addition to its small population threatened by human activity. In Chinese, the bird is named after its black head instead of locality, taking the name 黑头噪鸦 (black-headed jay).

== Description ==
The Sichuan jay is a small corvid around 29 to 32 cm with a black head and throat, greyish brown body, and light-coloured beak. The primaries, feet, and tail appears darker in shade. They weight about 89 to 108g, with males usually larger than females. Its appearance is overall unique in its distribution with no known cryptic species. In general, the Sichuan jay is bigger than its sister taxa, the Canada jay and the Siberian jay.

Four specimens collected at Tibet, Qinghai, and Sichuan shows white covert feathers that form a bar on the wing’s edge. From alleged observation of younger jays with similar white bars, this trait may be age-dependent and lost after moulting into an adult plumage. More investigation is required as there isn’t enough juvenile specimen that support the hypothesis.

For a subalpine bird species, they have remarkable fluffy plumage, covered nares, and contour feathers with large space between barbs for insulation and allow solar radiation to penetrate deeper into their body. All adaptation maximized heat transmission and reduced reflection.

== Taxonomy ==
The Sichuan jay is one of three members of the genus Perisoreus, the others being the Siberian jay, P. infaustus, found from Norway to eastern Russia, and the Canada jay, P. canadensis, restricted to the boreal forest and western montane regions of North America. Perisoreus internigrans was initially described by John E. Thayer and Outram Bangs in 1912 at the Sichuan province and placed in the genus Boanerges. However, after further discovery of behaviour by the bird collector Walter Reaves Zappey, Boanerges is merged into the already existent Perisoreus genus by Kleinschmidt and Weigold in 1922.

The defining traits that united all three Perisoreus species are their food-storing behaviour and living year-round on permanent territories in coniferous forests.

The genus Perisoreus carries meaning of “very” or “exceedingly” for the peri- prefix in Latin while the soreus suffix is the name of the bird of augury dedicated to Saturn. Meanwhile, internigrans means “blackish” in Latin.

This species has no known subspecies or hybridization.

== Distribution and habitat ==
The Sichuan jay’s can currently be found in 4 contiguous, Chinese inland provinces: Tibet, Qinghai, Gansu, and Sichuan. Notably, it inhabits coniferous forests dominated by spruce, between 2900m to 3800m above sea level in altitude, which spans from the northeast of Tibet to the southwest of Gansu and the southeast of Qinghai to the northwest of Sichuan. Information regarding their distribution is very limited and often defined by a singular specimen or observation of one flock in the region.

The population observed in each province is determined to be isolated due to high habitat fragmentation that erased connectivity. Although the Sichuan jay was always observed as a rare species with low abundance, they could have been historically widely distributed until human activity eroded the forests. It is hard to verify its former distribution due to inconsistent records and many geographical landmarks changing names in the past, making the assessment confusing.

== Behaviour ==
=== Vocalization ===
The Sichuan jay is often observed to move alone or in pair across the canopy, usually in short distance unless it is avoiding major disturbance. When in pairs, they never stray too far from their companion and seldom vocalize. Its call is composed of a single whistle note that repeats in bout of three, sounding like “ga-a ga-a ga-a” with emphasis on the first syllable. Based on the foraging behaviour that accompanies this call, it is likely a form of communication between species.

When caught during human contact, the Sichuan jay produces a consistent “gia gia gia” scream paired with intense thrashing and struggling, often eliciting nearby companions to help. It can also call in short, pressing “ga” while pecking its restraint, likely as a call for rescue.

As a social bird living in flock, the Sichuan jay exhibits mobbing behaviour when one member of the flock is endangered. When one bird is caught, the flock remains nearby, sometimes exposing themselves as a distraction tactic. If the trapped jay screams, the other jays will join in with a mobbing call to threaten the captor. The mobbing call doesn’t have a consistent pattern, but part of its sequence resembles the upland buzzard (Buteo hemilasius)’s prolonged mew.

Sichuan jay nestlings make a low begging calls starting from 12 days after hatching up to 40 days old to stimulate the parents’ feeding behaviour. A similar call is also observed in female birds prior to reproduction and when incubating eggs.

=== Reproduction ===
Sichuan jays’ reproduction starts in early March, ahead of other bird species that live in the same region. Part of the courtship involves the male presenting food as nuptial gifts to the female who makes a begging call. The nests are built in the higher altitude of their habitat, between 3350-3700m above sea level in mature forests. On average, three eggs are laid per nest and mostly incubated by the female. Hatching occurs in mid-April, and the nestlings fledge by early May. The species is monogamous.

Due to reproduction taking place during temperature below 0°C, the female jay has to stay in the nest and incubate for 95% of her time until the nestlings are one week old. She can only leave the nest for up to fifteen minutes before the eggs cool below the incubation temperature, hence the need to have food storage nearby. In addition, the female jay would beg the male jay and any other family members for food, only the breeding male will feed the female, but the other members will tend to nestlings and fledglings.

During the reproductive period, the breeding pair of Sichuan jay don’t actively chase other jays away, letting nonbreeders to stay around and help feeding the nestlings and removing fecal sacs. However, it is not known if the helpers are offsprings from a previous breeding year or nonlocal first-year birds. Nonbreeding helpers are also not a consistent presence. They may come and go during the reproductive period. The cooperative breeding let Sichuan jays aggregate in small groups of four on average.

Sichuan jays’ allofeeding behaviour happens earlier compared to the Canada jay, who only feed fledglings. Alloparenting is completely absent in the Siberian jay. These differences could point to adaptive response to difference environment as the three species lived in different ecosystems.

=== Diet and food caching ===
Sichuan jays are omnivorous, feeding on a mix of seeds, berries, insects, small invertebrates, and animal carcasses when given the chance. As soon as the offsprings fledge, they start following their parents in foraging. Food is usually found in groups by pecking tree bark, trunk cracks and crevices. Foraging on the floor under pine needles and vegetation is also frequently observed.

Food caching is an important behaviour in Sichuan jay, allowing them to have a food reserve during the harshest month of the year where reproduction happens at the same time. The species practice scatter hoarding by hiding food under tree bark, moss, and pine needles. It is hypothesized that early breeding in Sichuan jays could also be supported by a need to exploit their food reserve before the melt of snow, where warmer temperature and humidity would lead to rot. Therefore, their offspring would hatch when food is still edible then fledge at the start of spring, where resources return to their land. The earlier birth gives this species a competitive advantage over other birds occupying a similar niche.

=== Predation ===
There have been no formal observation of predators for Sichuan jay but based on the diversity of animals that share the same habitat, it can be inferred that Boreal Owl (Aegolius funereus), Ural Owl (Strix uralensis), Siberian weasel (Mustela sibirica), and a large flying squirrel (Petaurista sp.) could pose as threats. Although the listed predators are mostly nocturnal while the jays are diurnal. Eurasian Sparrowhawk (Accipiter nisus) and Eurasian Goshawk (Astur gentilis) could predate on adult jays, although it’s only an assumption.

== Conservation ==
The Sichuan jay is listed as near threatened on IUCN’s red list and first class on the List of Key Protecte Wild Animals in China. The best estimate is that about 15 000 individuals are still alive in the wild.

They are mostly situated in isolated fragments of highly elevated coniferous forests on the Qinghai-Tibet plateau of west-central China. These locations are generally isolated, because of the mountainous terrain of the region. Furthermore, historical logging activity have reduced their available habitat. Although the Sichuan jay exhibited some resilience to disturbance, its preference for mature forest during the breeding season would still results in habitat loss being a threat to the species.

It is predicted that both of the extent of suitable habitat and the suitability of that habitat will decrease substantially under climate change. Climate change might force these birds to migrate northward and upward, where areas remaining for such compensatory extension are quite restricted. Sichuan jays' caches of perishable food strongly depends on temperature factors, as early thaw would quickly deplete their reserve during a time of high energy demand. Without a winter cache of food that feeds the nesting female and nestlings, the species is forced to migrate to colder climate or face the threat of starvation.

In addition, acceptable habitat will become much more disconnected, which may increase the negative effects of climate change indirectly by slowing, or halting gene flow and accelerating the rate of extinction of fragmented local populations. Currently, the Sichuan jay still exhibits excellent genetic diversity similar to its sister species, the Siberian jay. Although this trend would not be sustainable if the habitat loss persists.

There is urgent need for the Chinese government to take actions before more subalpine coniferous forest are lost to logging and climate change. Many species such as Chinese grouse, Boreal owl, Sichuan Wood Owl, and blood pheasant would also benefit from protected habitat that helps Sichuan jays.
