= Allofeeding =

Food sharing behavior in birds

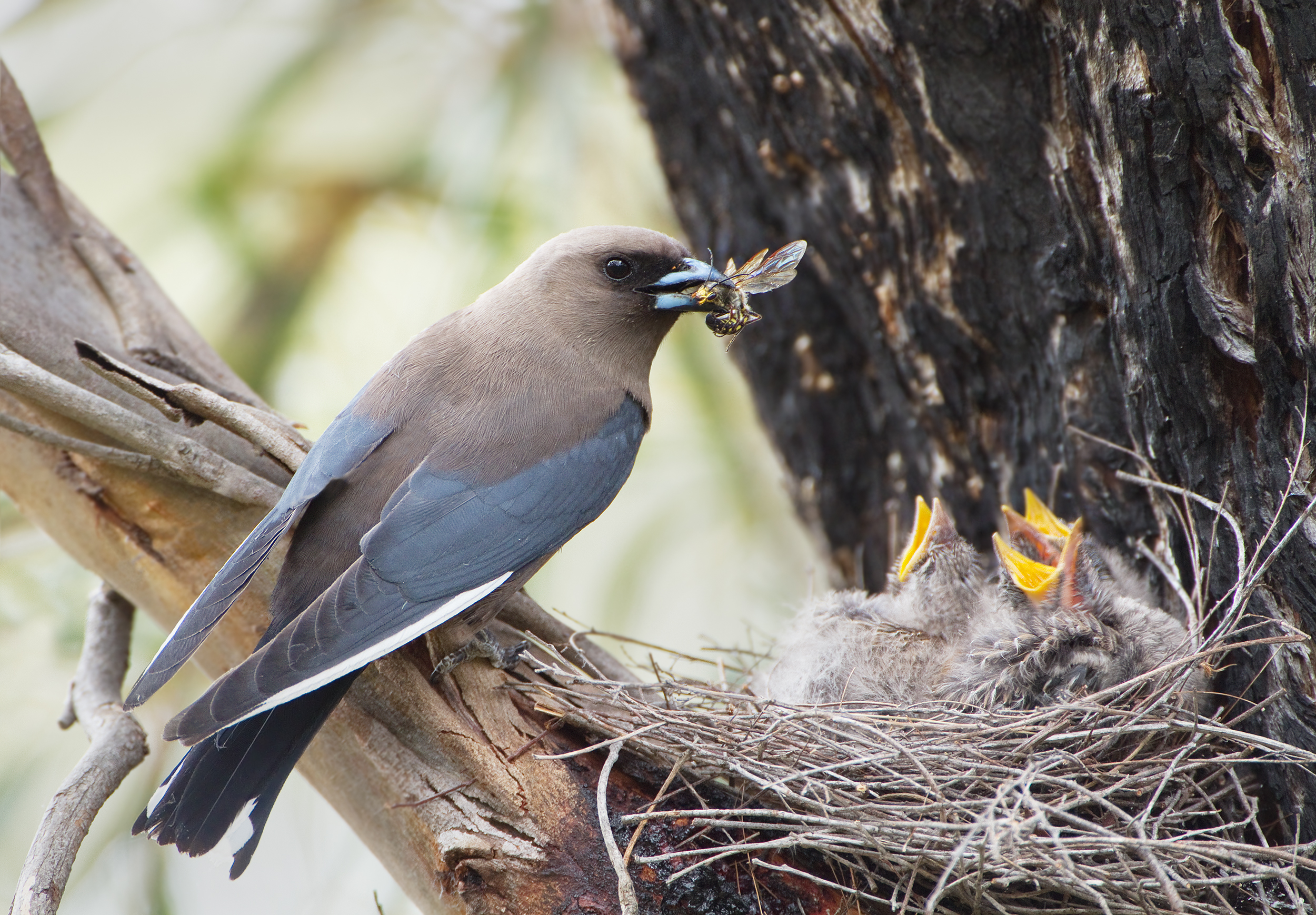
Dusky woodswallow (Artamus cyanopterus) parent feeding a wasp to chicks

Allofeeding is a type of food-sharing behaviour observed in cooperatively breeding species of birds. Allofeeding refers to a parent, sibling or unrelated adult bird feeding altricial hatchlings, which are dependent on parental care for their survival. Allofeeding also refers to food sharing between adults of the same species. Allofeeding can occur between mates during mating rituals, courtship, egg laying or incubation, between peers of the same species, or as a form of parental care.

Allofeeding evolved for different reasons in different species of birds. While sagebrush Brewer's sparrows allofeed to reduce predation during incubation, Sichuan jays allofeed to increase a female's nutritional level prior to egg laying, and chinstrap penguins allofeed to strengthen the bond between the pair during chick guarding.

While parental allofeeding is a common form of parental care among many species of birds, the practice is not inherently restricted to biological parents and their young, and is often done for reasons unrelated to the well-being of the chicks. Arabian babblers, for instance, peer allofeed in an attempt at increasing their social rank, whereas the king penguin considers those 'non-breeders' who allofeed chicks to be altruistic and highly revered. And the far more practical barn owl peer allofeeds merely to reduce sibling rivalry/competition during meal times.

Although many species of birds exhibit allofeeding, there are some species that do not perform allofeeding, such as the Siberian jay.

== Allofeeding between mates ==
Many species of migratory songbirds display allofeeding during the incubation period. During the incubation period, a male songbird will feed its mate through beak-to-beak interaction, while she sits on the eggs. This allofeeding behaviour is suggested to be adaptive because the male is indirectly investing in its offspring. The male uses its energy to forage and retrieve food, and to feed the female. This behaviour of the male reduces the nutritional stress of the female, because it reduces the amount of time the female spends foraging. In addition, the allofeeding behaviour decreases the number of times a female has to leave the nest, which in turn extends the incubation period and reduces the risk of the nest being detected by a predator. Overall, allofeeding behaviour contributes to increased fitness and is therefore considered advantageous. However, Nolan (1958) theorizes that allofeeding is non-adaptive and is derived from anticipatory parental care.

Allofeeding during the incubation period can also transpire through both the male and the female interchangeably feeding each other via beak-to-beak interactions, while a mate receiving the food incubates the eggs. Once feeding is completed, the recipient now becomes the feeder and the mate that was just foraging incubates the eggs. For example, sagebrush Brewer's sparrows (Spizella breweri breweri) allofeed in this manner. A recent study by Halley et al., 2015, examined allofeeding in twenty-four nests of sagebrush Brewer's sparrows. This study revealed that allofeeding occurred at low frequencies (55%) in nests with biparental incubation and no allofeeding occurred in uniparental nests. This study suggests that allofeeding is an intraspecific signal required to maintain social bonds between mates, in addition to increasing the nutrition levels of females and concealment of the nest. Furthermore, the study found that incubation sessions per hour were higher in biparental nests with allofeeding than in biparental nests without allofeeding. These findings indicate that allofeeding is beneficial because it reduces the risk of predation from visually oriented predators through increased nest concealment, which can maximize the fitness of males while increasing the fitness of females.

There have been many documented observations of allofeeding between mates (mate allofeeding). However, in penguins allofeeding between mates is rare. In 2010, allofeeding was reported for chinstrap penguins (P. antarctica) during the period of chick guarding. The researchers witnessed a male feeding a female, which had a large chick in its nest. The behaviour was engaged by the female frequently pecking the side of the male's bill to stimulate the male to regurgitate its food. This resulted in the male regurgitating its food into the female's open mouth. This allofeeding behaviour was identical to the manner in which a chick begs its parent for food. Notably, during this behaviour the female kept the attention of the male when the chick tried to gain the male's attention. It is proposed that mate allofeeding in chinstrap penguins was performed to strengthen the bond between the pair.

Allofeeding between mates can also occur during courtship. Courtship allofeeding occurs in half of bird subfamilies and mainly appears in monogamous bird species. Courtship allofeeding is hypothesized to strengthen the bond between pairs or increase a female's nutritional level before laying eggs. For example, in the Sichuan jay (P. internigrans), females are fed by only one male during courtship. It is suggested that allofeeding the female during courtship increases a female's nutritional level before egg laying. This behaviour was also recorded in Canada jays (P. canadensis).

== Allofeeding and parental care ==
A parent feeding a non-biological chick via bill-to-bill interactions is a form of allofeeding. Parental allofeeding occurs in all altricial species of birds to ensure proper growth, development, and to prevent starvation of their offspring.

=== Aptenodytes patagonicus ===
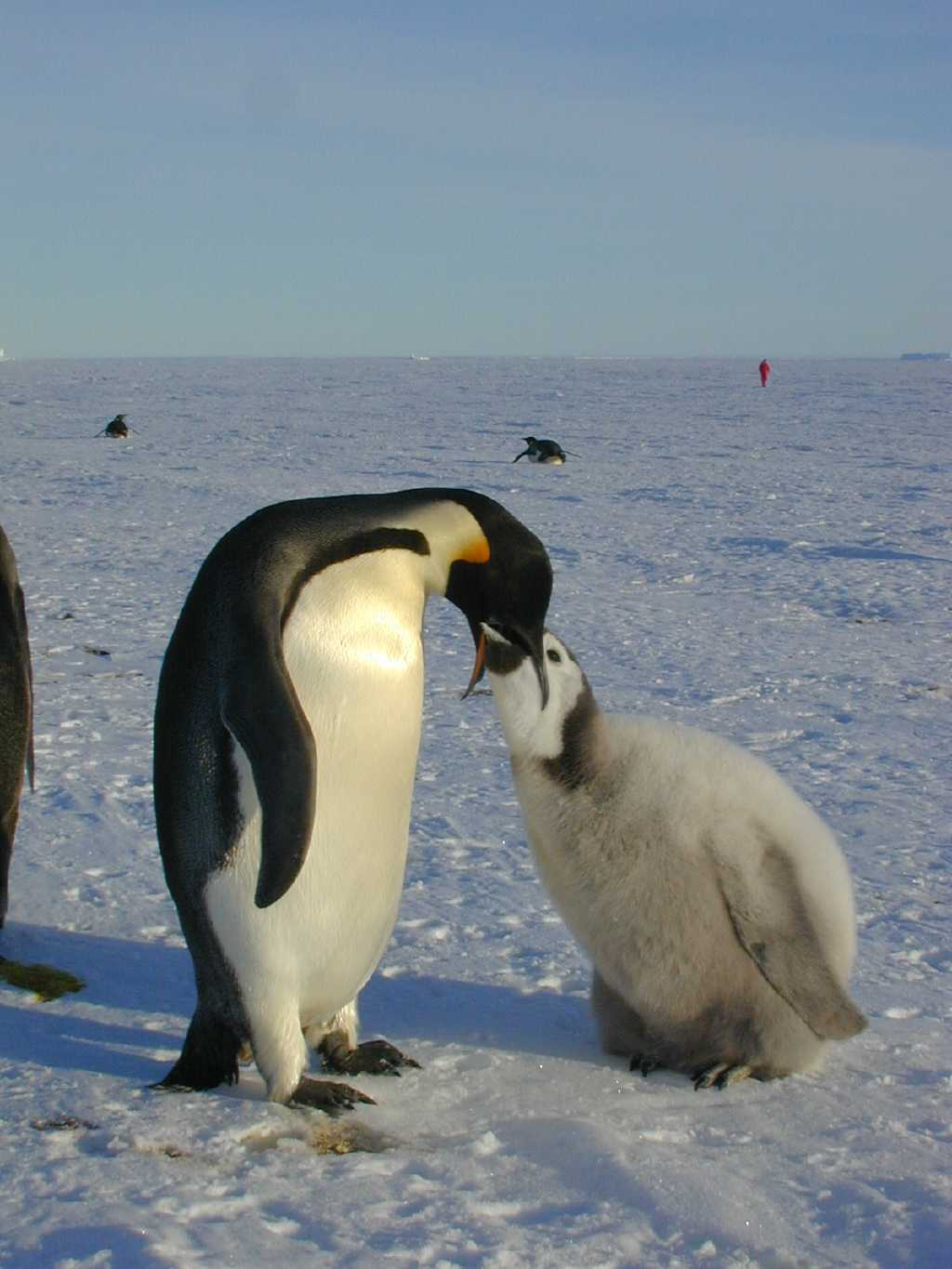
Emperor penguin (Aptenodytes patagonicus) feeding its offspring

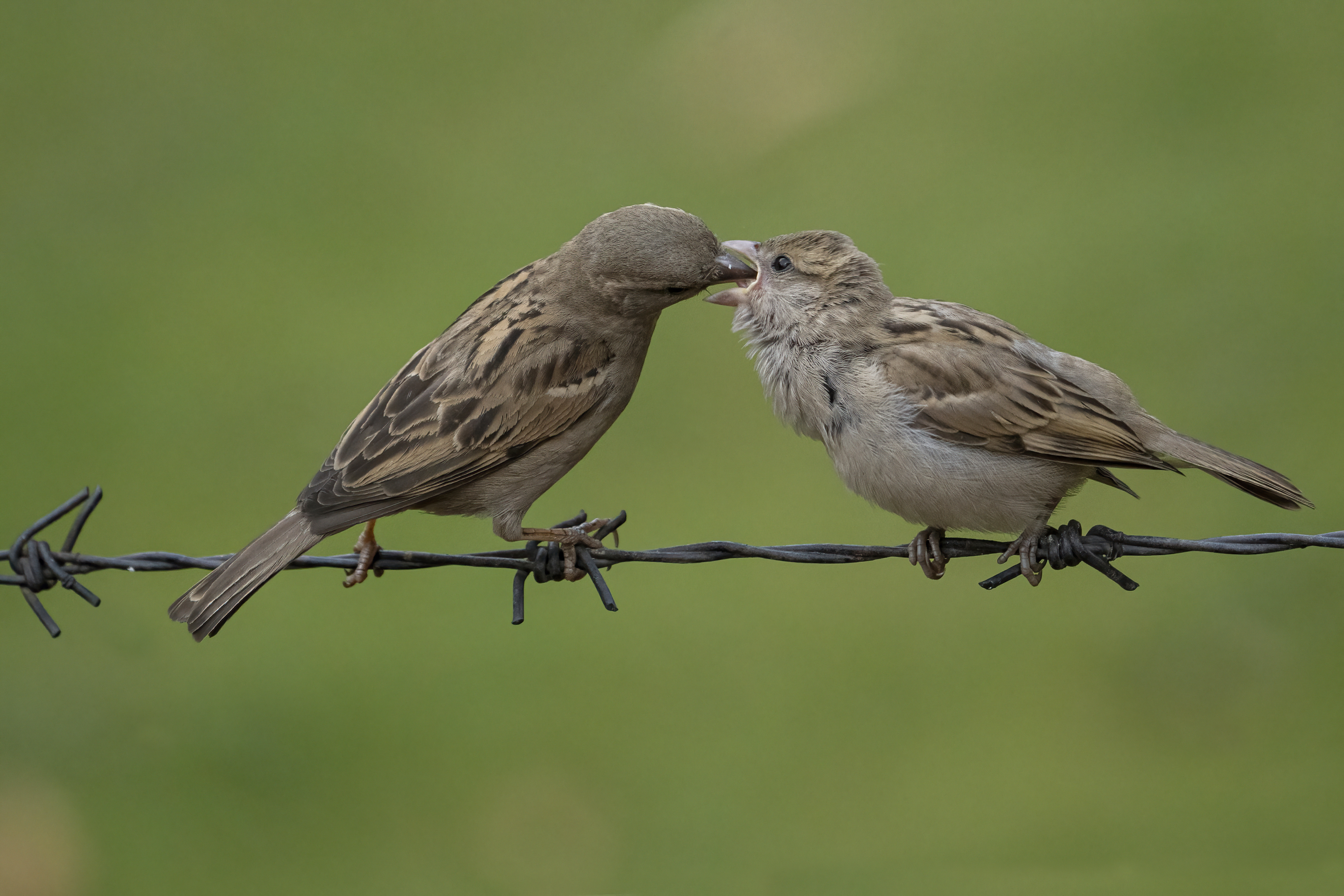
Female house sparrow feeding young

This form of allofeeding has been shown to be a form of parental care in some species, such as in king penguins (A. patagonicus). King penguins are pelagic seabirds. King penguin chicks form dense groups called crèches during winter for social thermoregulation when food availability is low. The formation of crèches results from the parents interchangeably leaving starving chicks to gather food from the sea. A study by Lecomte et al., 2015 examined the allofeeding behaviour in king penguins, in which they marked the white underbellies of 74 non-breeding adults and 103 breeding pairs with a unique dark colouring called dye-mark code of Nyanzol-D. Lecomte et al. (2015) found 22% of the marked adults feed 65% of the chicks in crèches, revealing that allofeeding behaviour was most common during the breeding season. Lecomte et al. (2015) also identified that most of the 22% of adult king penguins demonstrating allofeeding behaviour were unable to successfully breed along with few breeders performing the behaviour. The allofeeding behaviour resulted in more feedings for chicks, which is consistent with study by Pierre et al. (1994) that showed that allofeeding in penguins increases the chick growth rate from 35g/day to 190g/day. From these results, Lecomte et al. (2015) concluded that allofeeding increased the survival rate of chicks in crèches. The results imply that parental allofeeding in king penguins is an altruistic behaviour, where allofeeding benefits the young at a cost to the non-biological parent. Notably, no direct benefits to the non-biological parents have been described. The cost of allofeeding non-biological chicks resulted in no detrimental effects to the fitness of the alloparent, because the cost of allofeeding is low (several grams) when compared to the nutritional costs of an adult king penguin, which is several kilograms. However, it is suggested that allofeeding many chicks may cost each chick lost meals that can cause negative effects on the fitness of allofed chicks. In addition, allofeeding decreases when non-biological parents had offspring.

=== Pygoscelis antarcticus ===
The chinstrap penguin (P. antarcticus) is another species of penguin that displays parental allofeeding. Allofeeding in the chinstrap penguin has been observed between the female and its offspring. Similar to mate allofeeding in this species, the offspring of a female will peck the side of the female's bill to signal the female to regurgitate its food into the chick's open mouth.

=== Perisoreus internigrans ===
In Sichuan jays (P. internigrans), females are not the only sex that participates in the allofeeding of their offspring. During their first week of life, the chicks are only fed by the male. The male forages and stores food in a pouch within its throat. At the nest, the male regurgitates the semi-digested food from its pouch into the mouths of its chicks. After the first week, the male continues to feed the chicks while the female begins feeding the chicks. The female uses the same method as the male.

== Peer allofeeding ==
There have been many reported cases of allofeeding between siblings in several species of birds.

=== Turdoides sqamiceps ===
For example, the Arabian babblers (T. sqamiceps) are a territorial, desert-inhabiting species of bird that participate in cooperative breeding. In this species, non-breeders show numerous types of cooperative behaviour, including allofeeding. Adult and immature babblers, as well as previous and newly fledged babblers, will frequently engage in allofeeding behaviour.

Carlisle et al. (1986) revealed that Arabian babblers participate in peer allofeeding in order to increase social rank, which increases fitness. This allofeeding behaviour is supported by the Zahavi's hypothesis. An individual (a dominant babbler) can increase in social rank by allofeeding a subordinate babbler. On the contrary, an individual (a subordinate babbler) can decrease in social rank when they are allofed by a dominant babbler. Subordinate babblers have been observed refusing to be allofed by a dominant babbler. The refusal resulted in the dominant babbler becoming aggressive with the subordinate – hitting or chasing the subordinate. Dominate babblers also showed the same aggressive behaviours when a subordinate tried to allofeed it.

=== Tyto alba ===
Another species that exhibits peer allofeeding is the barn owl (T. alba). Barn owl nest siblings establish a hierarchy for the sharing of food resources via vocal negotiations. It is suggested that barn owl nest siblings show peer allofeeding to reduce sibling competition in the food sharing hierarchy. Peer allofeeding observed in 60 nestling pairs revealed that the behaviour occurs by a donor sibling placing the food item on the ground in front of the receiver sibling, which transfers the food item to its bill using its talons. Alternatively, the donor sibling uses its bill to place the food item in the bill of the receiver sibling. As well, peer allofeeding behaviour in barn owl siblings is proposed to increase the inclusive fitness of the peer performing the allofeeding.

== Intraspecific allofeeding ==
=== Perisoreus internigrans ===
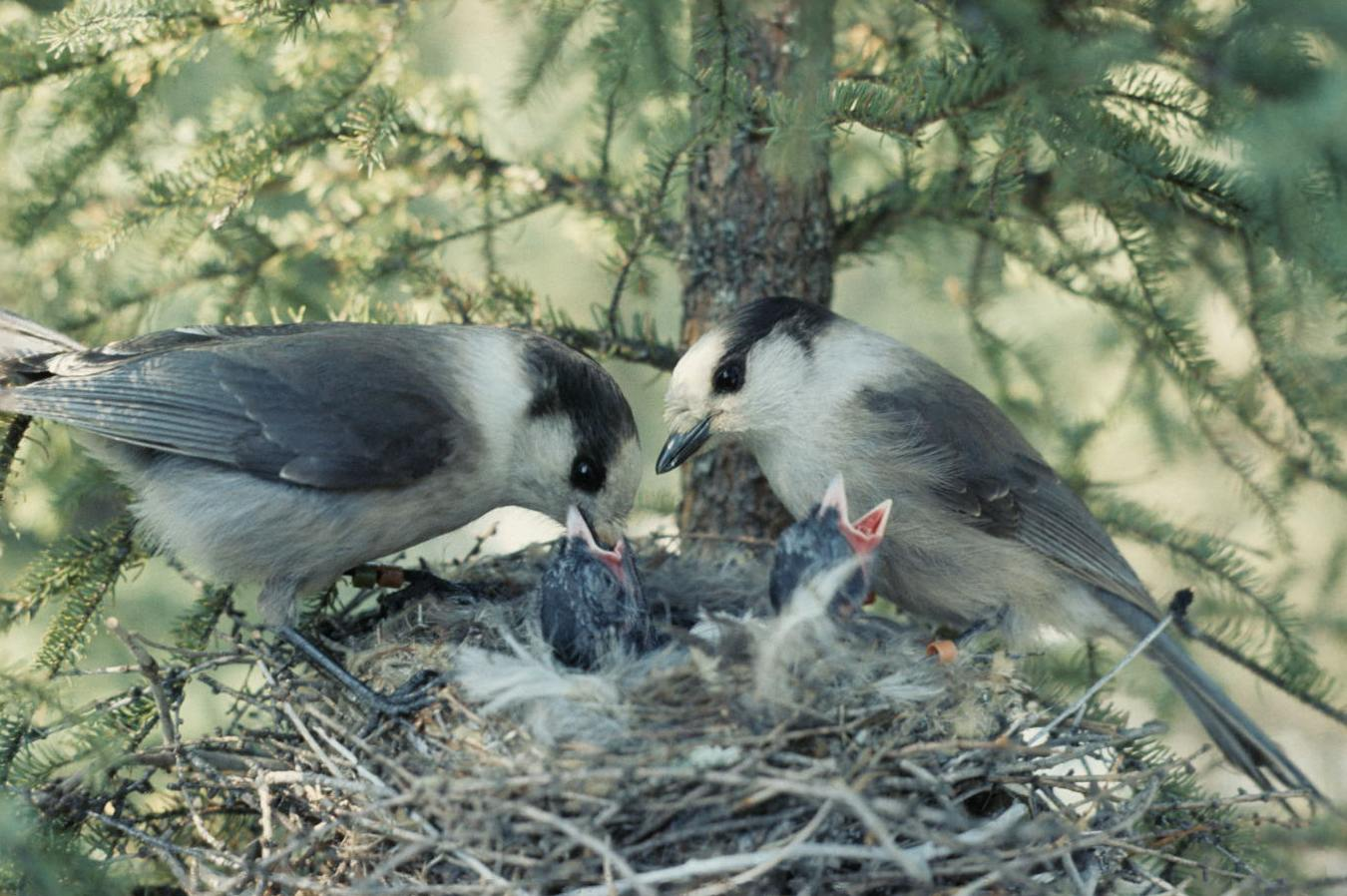
Canada jays (Perisoreus canadensis) feeding offspring at the nest

Intraspecific allofeeding in Sichuan jays (P. internigrans) is performed during the nestling and fledging period by non-breeders. One to three non-breeders support a nesting breeding pair by feeding the chicks, regurgitating the food from their throat pouches. In 2009, Jing et al. determined that two non-breeders contributed to 44% of feedings in the nest of two Sichuan jays. Jing et al. (2009) suggest that allofeeding behaviour contributes to increased nest survival.

In Sichuan jays, allofeeding is hypothesized to be evolutionary selected. In this species, two to three non-breeders will allofeed the young of a breeding pair. The large body mass (21% heavier than Siberian jays) of the Sichuan jays, and the presence of more than one non-breeder, allows one non-breeder to ward off a predator while another non-breeder protects the young from additional predators. Both the large body mass of the non-breeders and the presence of multiple non-breeders reduce the risk of injury or death when predators are encountered. This reveals that the benefits of allofeeding the young outweigh the cost of injury or death of the non-breeder and/or chick when more than one non-breeder is present. Peer allofeeding has also been observed in the Canada jay (P. canadensis). In the gray jay, non-breeders allofeed the young after fledging.

Not all species of jays allofeed their young, such as the Siberian jay (P. infaustus). In Siberian jays, non-breeders do not allofeed the chicks of a breeding pair. It is predicted that Siberian jays do not display allofeeding because the cost of predation is too high. Siberian jays are continuously threatened by more dangerous predators, the Eurasian sparrowhawk (A. nisus) and northern goshawk (A. gentilis), than Canada jays, which are threatened by the Eurasian red squirrel (S. vulgaris). One non-breeder per breeding pair and the small size (21% less body mass than the Sichuan jays) of the Siberian jays, in combination with continuous risk of predation, reveals that the non-breeding Siberian jays are unable to confront predators and protect the nest simultaneously. This indicates that the cost of allofeeding the young is more costly to the non-breeder when one non-breeder is present, because an encounter with a predator increases the risk of injury and death of both the young and the non-breeder. This reveals that the benefit of allofeeding the young does not exceed the cost of injury or death of non-breeder and/or young. This is consistent with the predator-avoidance hypothesis, suggesting that the cost of allofeeding in the Siberian jays prevents allofeeding from being evolutionary selected.

== See also ==
- Alloparenting
- Helpers at the nest
