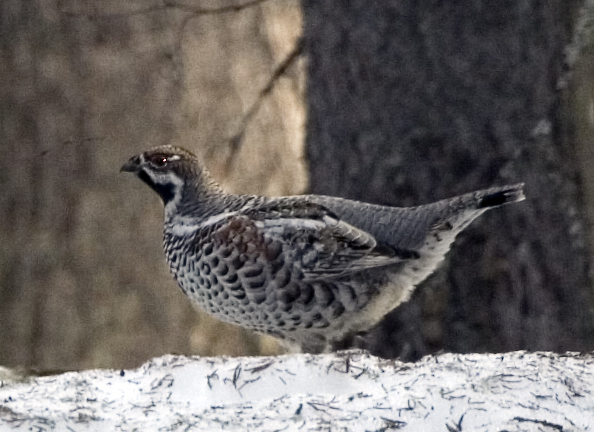
- Male hazel grouse (Tetrastes bonasia)

Scientific classification
- Kingdom: Animalia
- Phylum: Chordata
- Class: Aves
- Order: Galliformes
- Family: Phasianidae
- Tribe: Tetraonini
- Genus: Tetrastes; Keyserling & J. H. Blasius, 1840

Type species
- Tetrao bonasius Linnaeus, 1758

Species
- Tetrastes bonasia Tetrastes sewerzowi

= Tetrastes =

Genus of birds

Tetrastes is a genus of birds in the grouse subfamily. It contains the following species:

Image	Scientific name	Common name	Distribution
	Tetrastes bonasia	Hazel grouse	northern Eurasia as far east as Hokkaido, and as far west as central and eastern Europe
	Tetrastes sewerzowi	Chinese grouse	central China.

Both species live in forests with at least some conifers in cool regions of the Northern Hemisphere.
