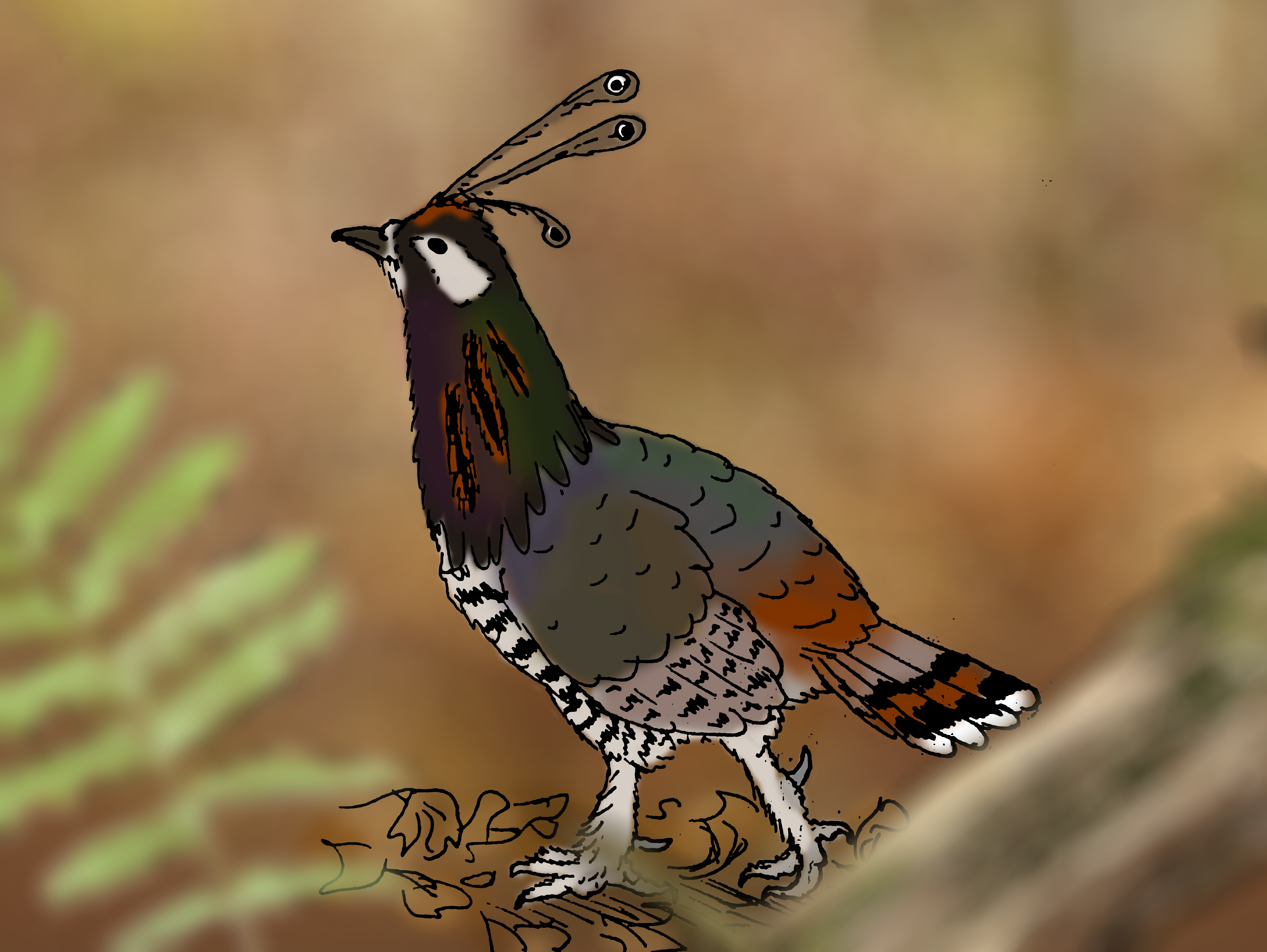
- Reconstruction of Proagriocharis showing speculative plumage

Scientific classification
- Domain: Eukaryota
- Kingdom: Animalia
- Phylum: Chordata
- Class: Aves
- Order: Galliformes
- Family: Phasianidae
- Subfamily: Phasianinae
- Tribe: Tetraonini
- Genus: †Proagriocharis; Martin & Tate, 1970
- Species: †P. kimballensis

Binomial name
- †Proagriocharis kimballensis Martin & Tate, 1970

= Proagriocharis =

Proagriocharis Temporal range: Pliocene

Extinct species of bird

Proagriocharis is a genus of extinct turkey relatives from the upper Pliocene. It contained a single species, Proagriocharis kimballensis, known from Nebraska, which was smaller than most other turkeys.
