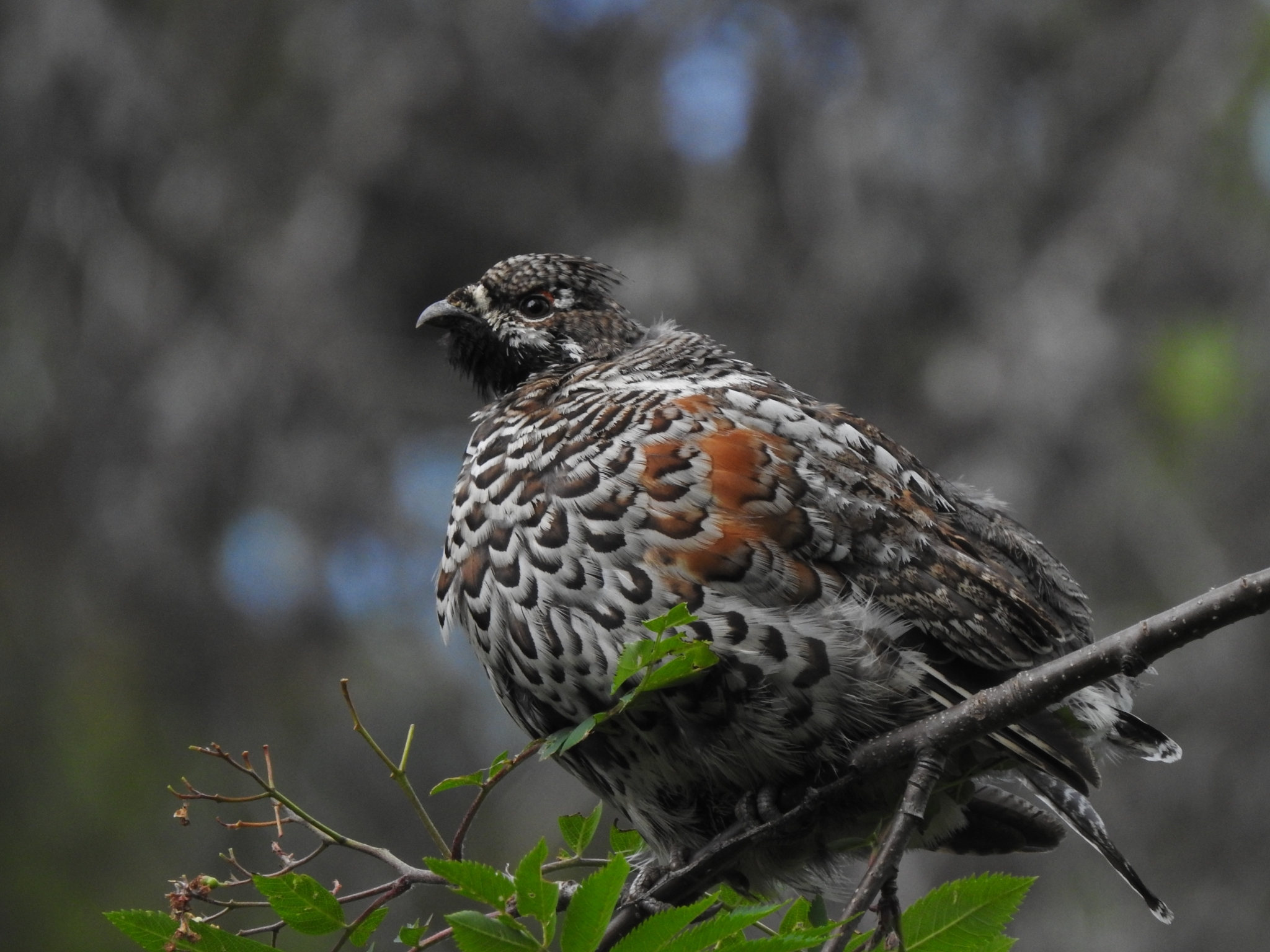
- in Lapland, Finland

Conservation status
- Least Concern (IUCN 3.1)

Scientific classification
- Kingdom: Animalia
- Phylum: Chordata
- Class: Aves
- Order: Galliformes
- Family: Phasianidae
- Genus: Tetrastes
- Species: T. bonasia

Binomial name
- Tetrastes bonasia (Linnaeus, 1758)
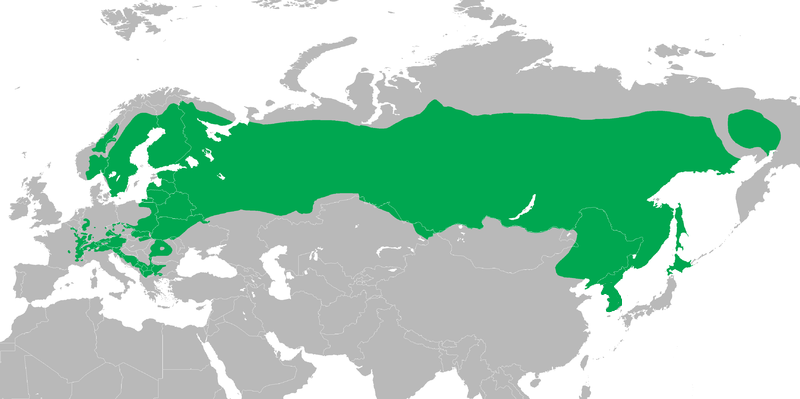
- Range of T. bonasia

Synonyms
- Tetrao bonasia Linnaeus, 1758; Bonasa bonasia (Linnaeus, 1758)

= Hazel grouse =

Species of bird

The hazel grouse (Tetrastes bonasia), sometimes called the hazel hen, is one of the smaller members of the grouse tribe of birds. It is a sedentary species, breeding across the Palearctic as far east as Hokkaido, and as far west as central Europe, in dense, damp, mixed coniferous woodland, preferably with some spruce. The bird is sometimes referred to as "rabchick" (from рябчик) by early 20th century English speaking travellers to Russia.

== Taxonomy ==
The hazel grouse was formally described in 1758 by the Swedish naturalist Carl Linnaeus in the tenth edition of his Systema Naturae under the binomial name Tetrao bonasia. Although Linnaeus specified the type locality as Europe, this is restricted to Sweden. The hazel grouse is now placed with the Chinese grouse in the genus Tetrastes that was introduced in 1840 by Alexander von Keyserling and Johann Heinrich Blasius. The specific epithet bonasia is Modern Latin for the hazel grouse, from the Italian name for the species.

Eleven subspecies are recognised:

- T. b. rhenanus (Kleinschmidt, 1917) – northeast France, Luxembourg, Belgium and west Germany
- T. b. styriacus (von Jordans & Schiebel, 1944) – Alps, south Poland to Hungary
- T. b. schiebeli (Kleinschmidt, 1943) – Balkan Peninsula
- T. b. rupestris (Brehm, CL, 1831) – south Germany and Czech Rep.
- T. b. bonasia (Linnaeus, 1758) – west, south Scandinavia and central Poland east to the Ural Mountains (Russia)
- T. b. griseonota Salomonsen, 1947 – north Sweden
- T. b. sibiricus Buturlin, 1916 – northeast Russia, north, central Siberia and north Mongolia
- T. b. kolymensis Buturlin, 1916 – east Siberia
- T. b. amurensis Riley, 1916 – northeast China to north Korea Peninsula
- T. b. yamashinai Momiyama, 1928 – Sakhalin (Russia)
- T. b. vicinitas Riley, 1915 – Hokkaido (Japan)

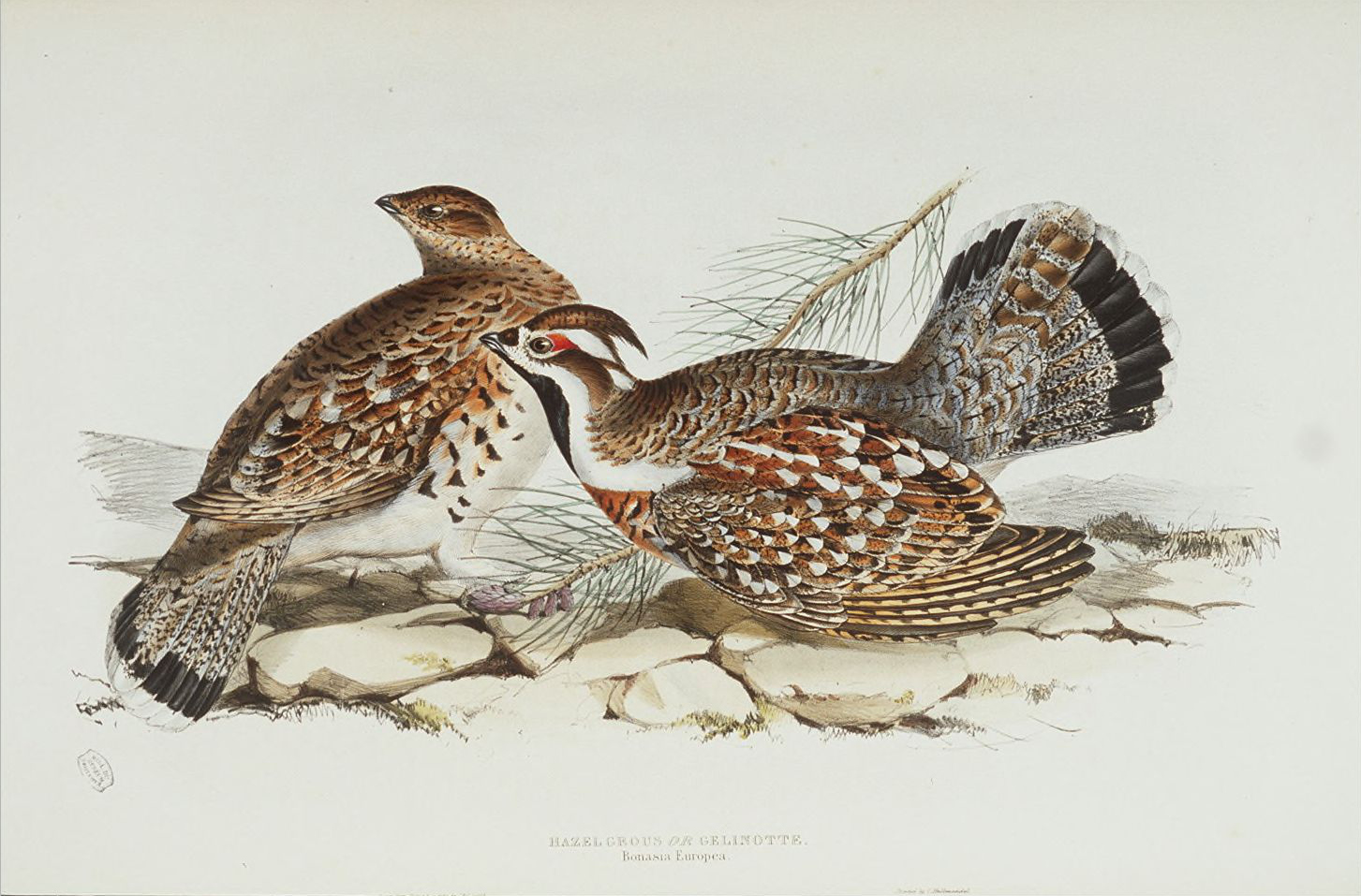
Hazel grouse drawn by Elizabeth Gould, 1837

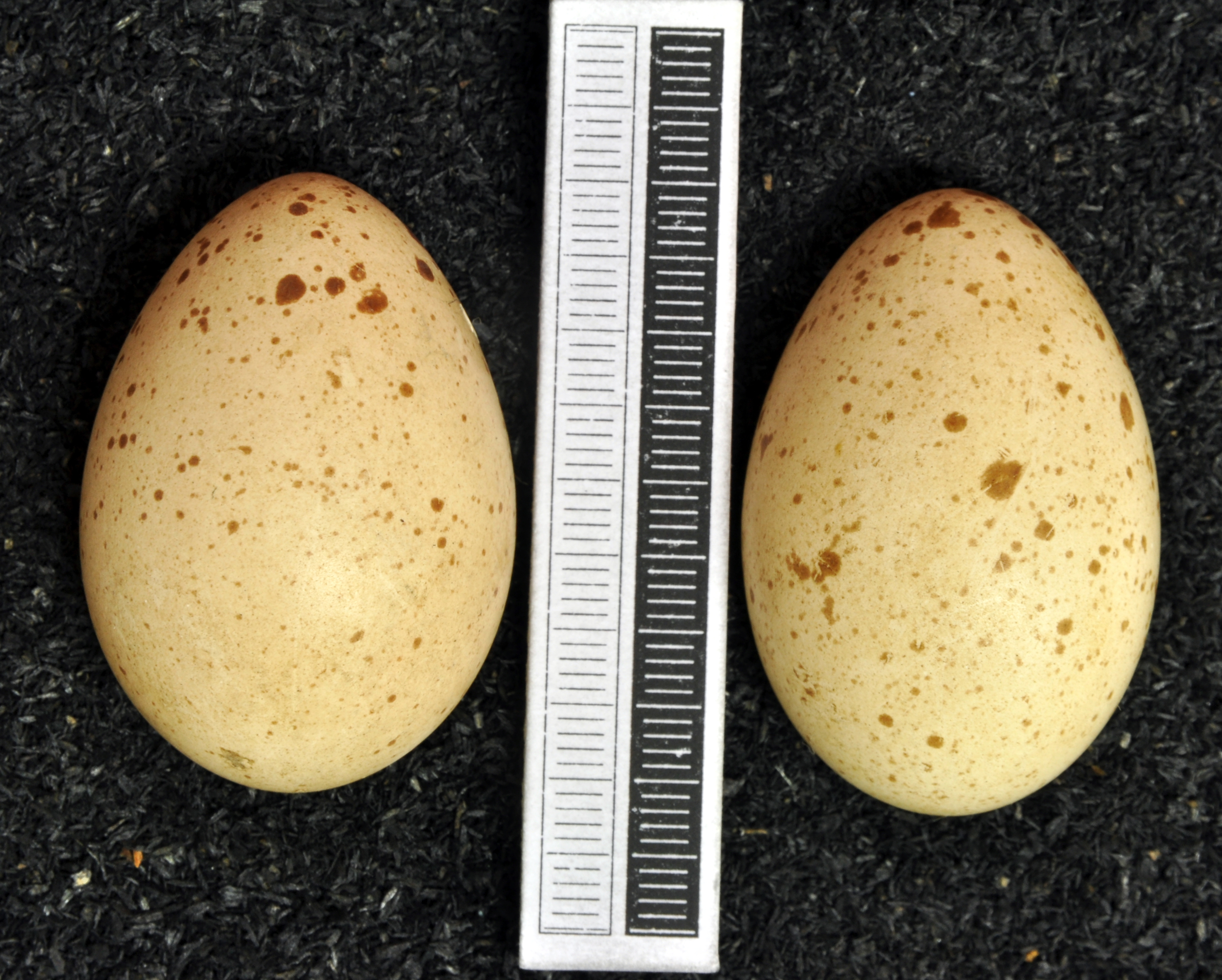
Eggs, Collection Museum Wiesbaden

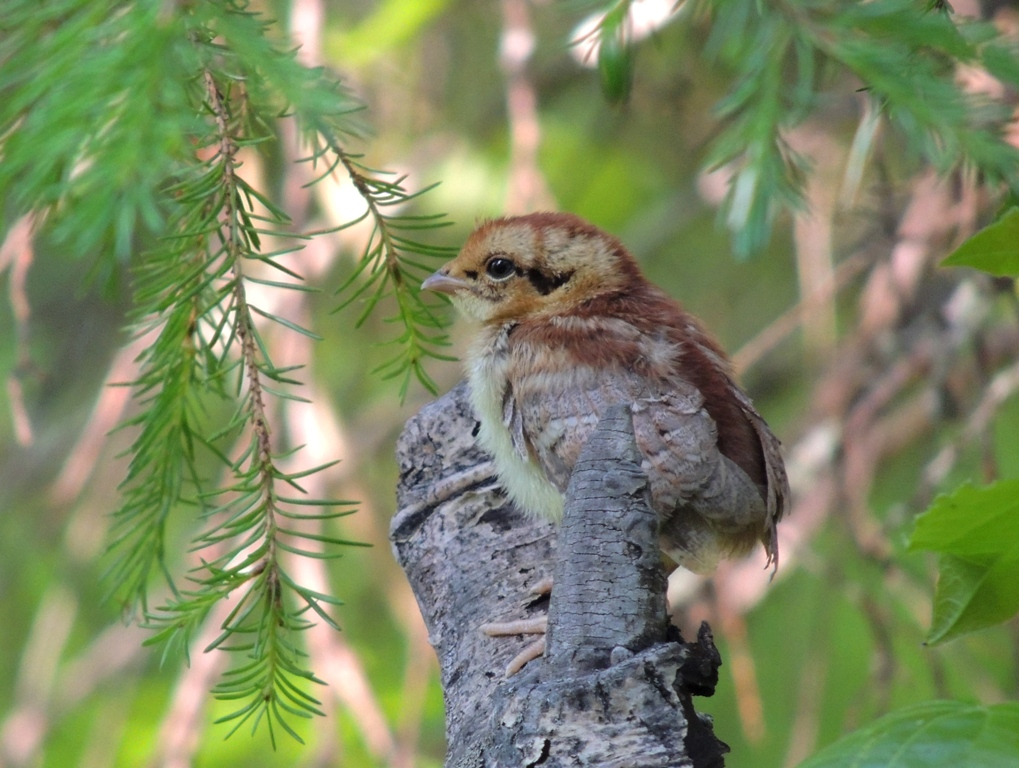
Chick

== Description ==
This is a relatively small grouse at 35–39 cm (14–15 in) length. The plumage of this plump bird is finely patterned, but it essentially has grey upperparts, brown wings and chestnut flecked white underparts.

The male has a short erectile crest and a white-bordered black throat. The female has a shorter crest and lacks the black color on the throat. In flight, this species shows a black-tipped grey tail.

The male has a high-pitched ti-ti-ti-ti-ti call, and the female a liquid tettettettettet. These calls, along with the burr of the flying birds' wings, are often the only indication of this grouse's presence, since its shyness and dense woodland habitat make it difficult to see.

== Behaviour and ecology ==
=== Food and feeding ===
This bird feeds on the ground, taking mainly plant food, supplemented by insects when breeding.

=== Breeding ===
These birds nest on the ground, with 3–6 eggs being the normal clutch size. The female incubates the eggs and cares for the chicks alone, as is typical with gamebirds.
