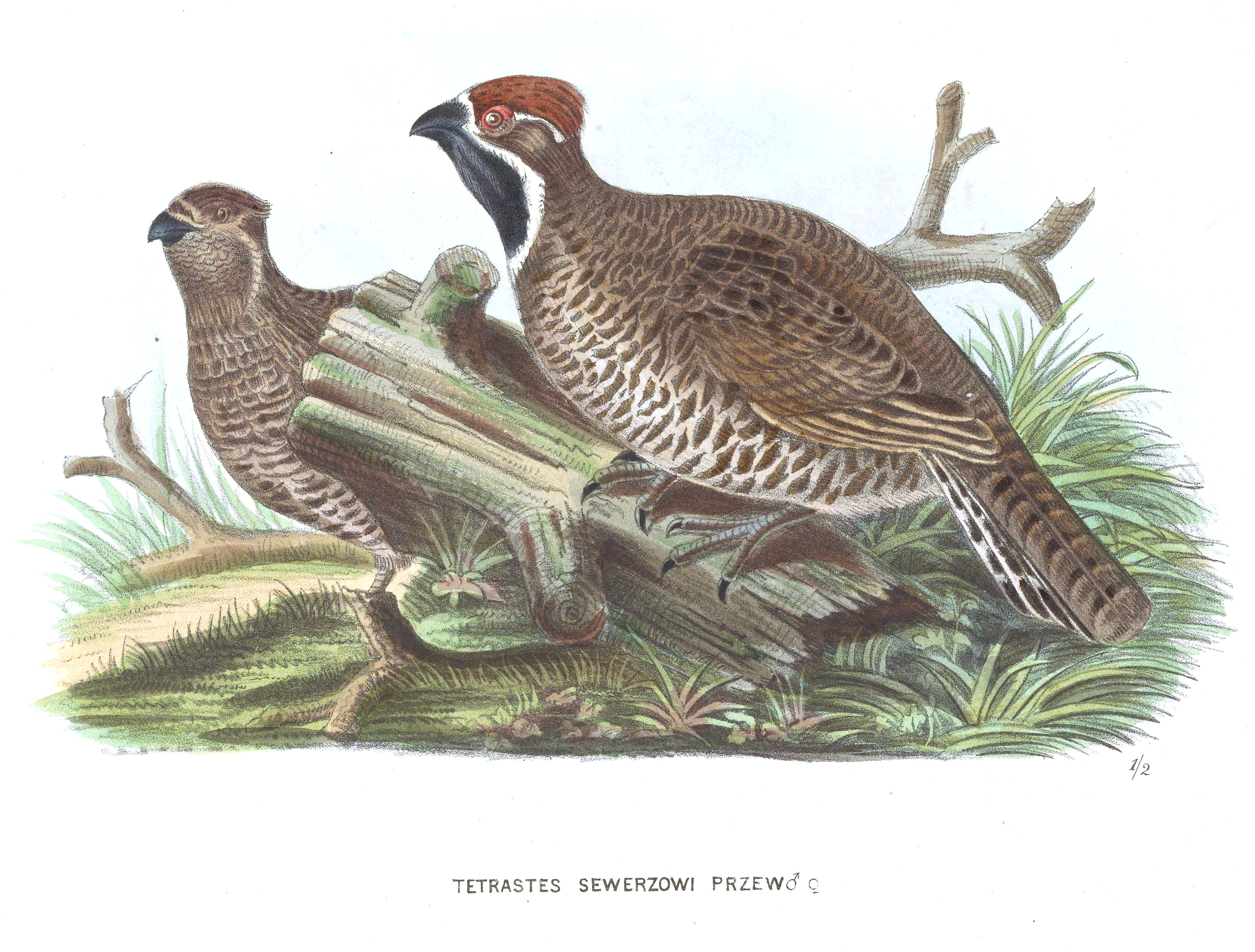

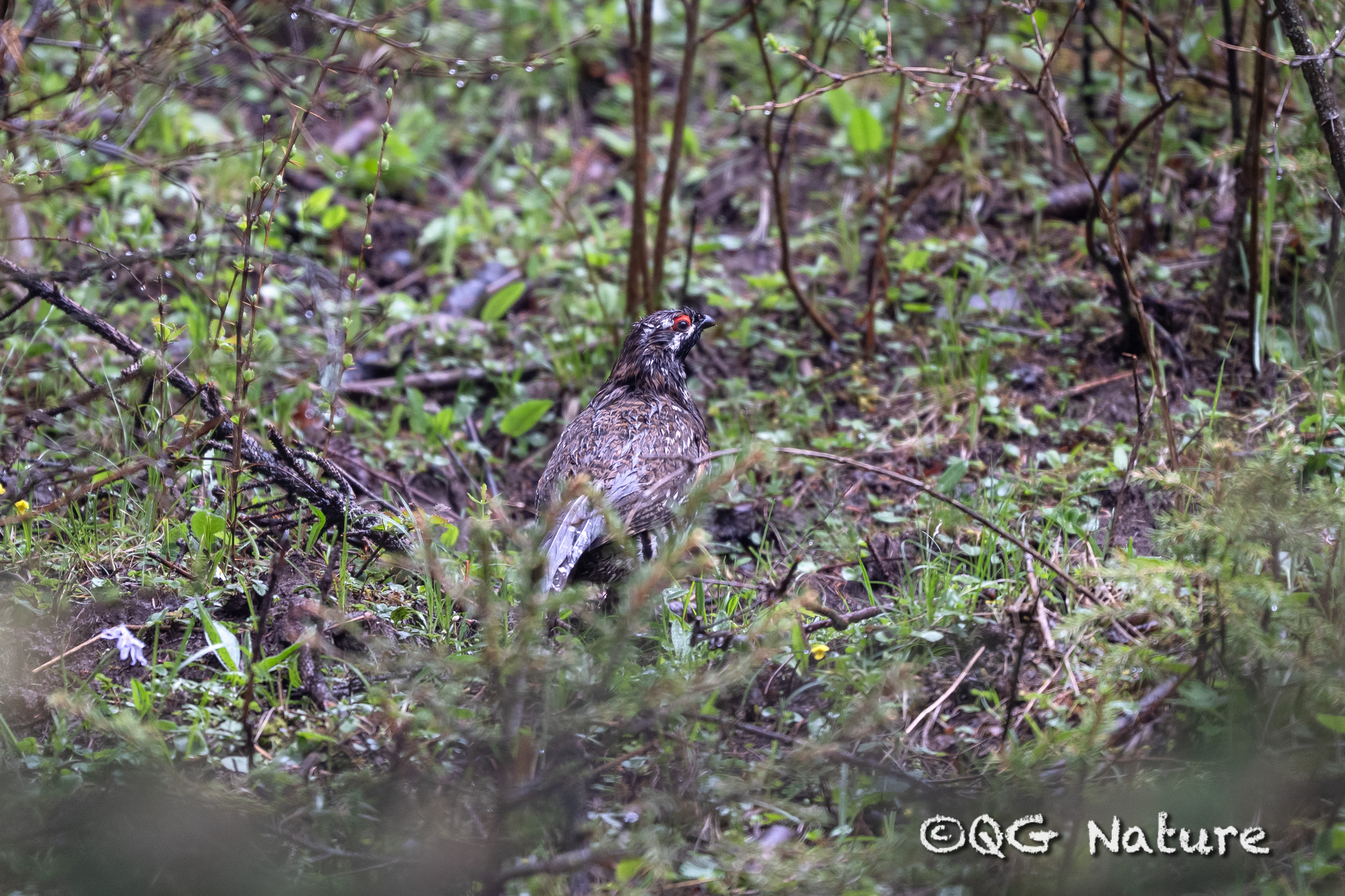

Conservation status
- Near Threatened (IUCN 3.1)

Scientific classification
- Kingdom: Animalia
- Phylum: Chordata
- Class: Aves
- Order: Galliformes
- Family: Phasianidae
- Genus: Tetrastes
- Species: T. sewerzowi

Binomial name
- Tetrastes sewerzowi Przewalski, 1876

Synonyms
- Bonasa sewerzowi

= Chinese grouse =

Species of bird

The Chinese grouse (Tetrastes sewerzowi), also known as Severtzov's grouse, is the smallest grouse in the world. The species was first discovered and described by Przewalski in 1876.

It is endemic to China, where it is considered endangered by the China Red Data Book.

The bird is named after a Russian explorer and naturalist, Nikolai Alekseevich Severtzov.

== Description ==
The females have an average mass between 270–407 g (9.5–14.4 oz), and the males between 279–390 g (9.8–13.8 oz). The average body length is 327–384 mm (12.9–15.1 in) for females and 355–403 mm (14.0–15.9 in) for males, making it the smallest of the grouse species.

Chinese grouse are mostly brown, with lots of white and black patterning on their bellies. The males have a black chin patch, while females do not. Chinese grouse look similar to hazel grouse (Tetrastes bonasia), with a few differences in plumage colouration and pattern. Both males and females have a red comb above their eyes, though it is more prominent in the males.

== Taxonomy ==
All grouse are in the family Phasianidae, which also includes pheasants and turkeys. Different sources place the Chinese grouse into either the Tetrastes genus along with the hazel grouse (Tetrastes bonasia), or the Bonasa genus, and there are still uncertainties about the phylogenetic relationships of these genera.

== Habitat and distribution ==
The Chinese grouse is found exclusively in China, in the provinces of Gansu, Qinghai, Sichuan, Yunnan, and Tibet. As of the year 2000, the distribution of Chinese grouse extended to an area of 155,000 km^{2} (60,000 sq mi).

There are two main habitat requirements for Chinese grouse: coniferous trees for cover, and deciduous trees and shrubs for food. The species is found mostly in the mountains, between 2,400 and 4,300 m (7,900 and 14,100 ft) of elevation.

=== Status and conservation ===
The Chinese grouse is considered an endangered species in China. The population has been declining over the years. The main cause of this decline is habitat loss due to deforestation and habitat fragmentation. Current efforts are being made in China to stabilize the population, such as reducing logging.

The IUCN also recognizes that the population is declining. The Chinese grouse is listed as Near Threatened on the IUCN Red List.

== Behavior ==
=== Vocalizations ===
The Chinese grouse, like other grouse species, use vocalizations when defending their territory. Their vocalizations can be described as a "whirring, bi-syllabic flutter-jump". These vocalizations are much less complex than those of the North American ruffed grouse. Male Chinese grouse also make an "offensive-cantus" (a series of nasal clucks) when courting females and in other instances of short-distance communication. They will also fan out their tail feathers, spread their wings, and fluff up their plumage to appear larger and more imposing.

Chinese grouse will also produce a variety of alarm calls.

Among the three species in the genus Bonasa, of which the Chinese grouse is sometimes considered to be a part, the Chinese grouse has the least complex vocalizations.

=== Diet ===
Severtzov's grouse feed primarily on the buds and twigs of willow trees (Salix spp.) during the winter months. During the breeding season, males continue to feed primarily on willow, while females supplement their diets with seeds from the dragon spruce (Picea asperata), invertebrates, and forbs to increase nutrient and energy intake in preparation for laying eggs.

=== Reproduction ===
The breeding season for Chinese grouse begins between March and May. Males return to their breeding grounds earlier than females and begin defending their territories with vocalizations and displays. Males must compete for a chance to mate, since there are more males than females in the population. Once a female has chosen a mate, the pair will live together in the male's territory until the end of the breeding season. During the breeding season, females tend to gain mass and males tend to lose mass.

Chinese grouse usually nest at the base of trees. The females will lay eggs every other day until reaching a clutch size of 5-8 eggs. The eggs are light yellow with brown spots.

The females will then incubate the eggs for 27–29 days. When the precocial chicks hatch, they will follow the female for 2–3 months before dispersing from the territory.
