= Harry Swarth =

American ornithologist (1878–1935)

- Born: January 26, 1878
- Died: October 22, 1935 (aged 57)

Harry Schelwald Swarth (January 26, 1878 – October 22, 1935) was an American ornithologist.

Swarth was born in Chicago, Illinois; during his childhood, he was interested in birds and natural history. He began collecting birds in 1894 and attended Baptist College, Los Angeles after grammar school. In 1891, his family moved to Los Angeles.

In 1896, he joined the first extended natural history collecting expedition in Arizona. His 1914 A Distributed List of the Birds of Arizona is recognized as the first attempt to catalog all the birds of the state.

Swarth worked at the Field Museum of Natural History from 1905 to 1908, at the University of California Berkeley from 1908 to 1927, and at the California Academy of Sciences starting in 1927.

Swarth joined the Cooper Ornithological Club (now the Cooper Ornithological Society) in 1897 and remained a member until his death. He was a member of the American Ornithologists' Union and the British Ornithologists' Union. He died of a heart ailment at Berkeley, California on October 22, 1935.

== Bibliography ==
Some of Swarth's published books and monograph journal articles include:

- Birds of the Huachuca Mountains Arizona, monograph in Pacific Coast Avifauna (1904)
- A Study of a Collection of Geese of the Branta canadensis Group from the San Joaquin Valley California (1913)
- A Distributional List of the Birds of Arizona, monograph in Pacific Coast Avifauna (1914)
- Birds of the Papago Saguaro National Monument And The Neighboring Region, Arizona (1920)
- A Distributional List of the Birds of British Columbia, monograph in Pacific Coast Avifauna (1925)
- The Faunal Areas of Southern Arizona: A Study in Animal Distribution (1929)
- A Systematic Study of the Cooper Ornithological Club (1929)
- The Faunal Areas of Southern Arizona: A Study in Animal Distribution, article in the Proceedings of the California Academy of Sciences
- The Avifauna of the Galapagos Islands, 1931, article in the Occasional Papers of the California Academy of Sciences (1931)
