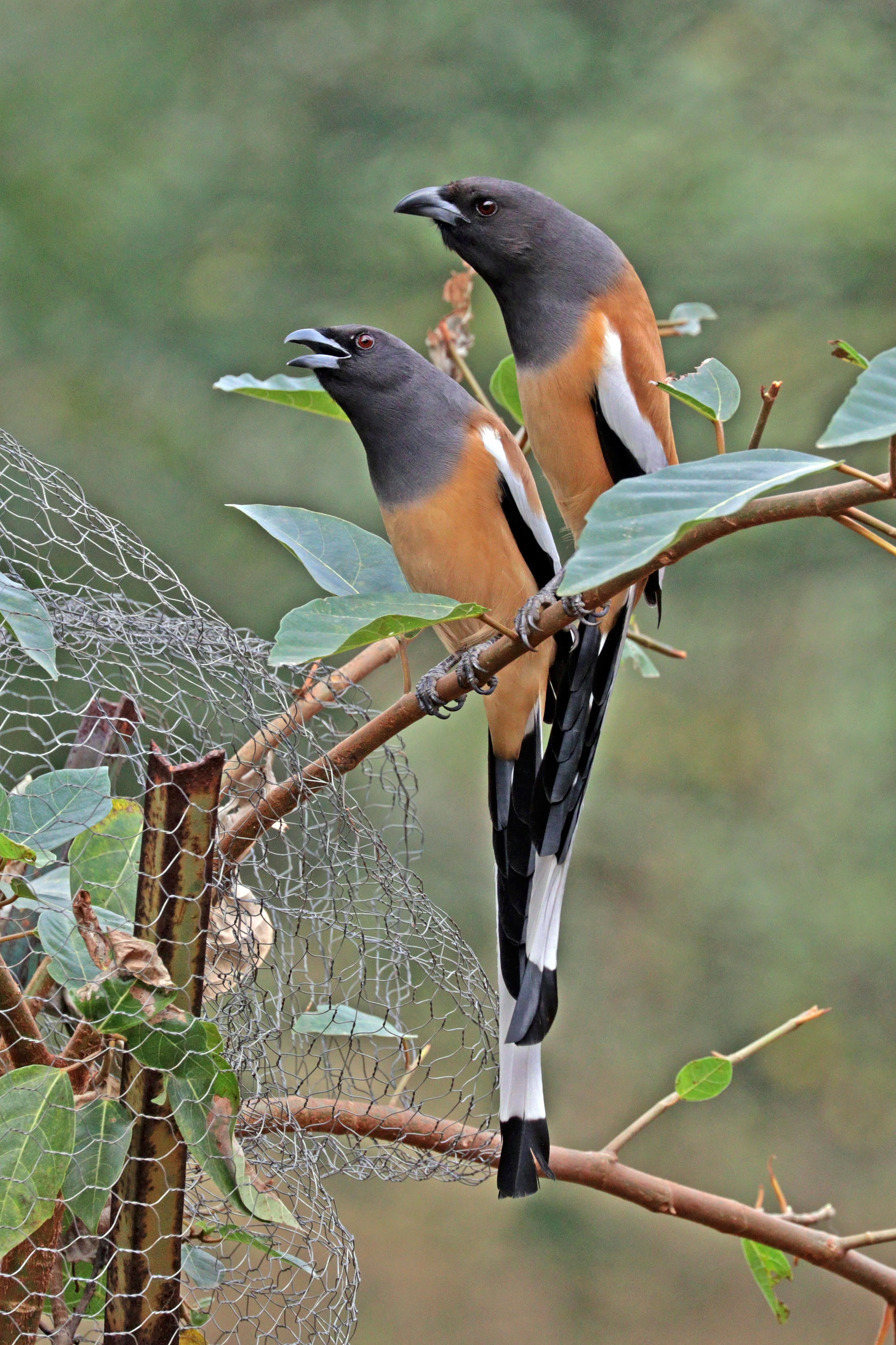
- Rufous treepie pair

Scientific classification
- Kingdom: Animalia
- Phylum: Chordata
- Class: Aves
- Order: Passeriformes
- Family: Corvidae
- Subfamily: Crypsirininae; Swainson, 1831

Type genus
- Crypsirina Vieillot, 1816

Genera
- Crypsirina; Dendrocitta; Platysmurus; Temnurus

= Treepie =

Treepies

Group of birds

The treepies (known also as crypsirinines from the subfamily's name, Crypsirininae) comprise four closely related genera (Dendrocitta, Crypsirina, Temnurus and Platysmurus) of long-tailed passerine birds in the family Corvidae. There are 12 species of treepie. Some treepies are similar to magpies. Most treepies are black, white, gray or brown. They are found in Southeast Asia. They live in tropical forests. They are highly arboreal and rarely come to the ground to feed.

== Species ==
Following Ericson et al. (2005), the black magpies are placed with the treepies:

Image	Genus	Living species
	Crypsirina	Hooded treepie, Crypsirina cucullata; Racket-tailed treepie, Crypsirina temia
	Dendrocitta	Andaman treepie, Dendrocitta bayleii; Bornean treepie, Dendrocitta cinerascens; Grey treepie, Dendrocitta formosae; Collared treepie, Dendrocitta frontalis; White-bellied treepie, Dendrocitta leucogastra; Sumatran treepie, Dendrocitta occipitalis; Rufous treepie, Dendrocitta vagabunda
	Platysmurus	Malayan black magpie, Platysmurus leucopterus; Bornean black magpie, Platysmurus aterrimus
	Temnurus	Ratchet-tailed treepie, Temnurus temnurus
