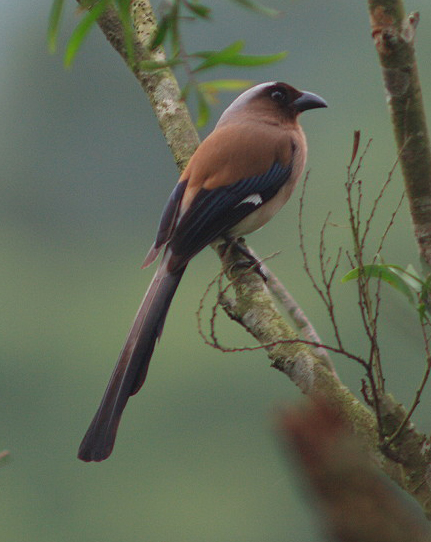
- Subspecies formosae from Taiwan

Conservation status
- Least Concern (IUCN 3.1)

Scientific classification
- Kingdom: Animalia
- Phylum: Chordata
- Class: Aves
- Order: Passeriformes
- Family: Corvidae
- Genus: Dendrocitta
- Species: D. formosae

Binomial name
- Dendrocitta formosae R. Swinhoe, 1863

Subspecies
- D. f. formosae R. Swinhoe, 1863; D. f. occidentalis Ticehurst, 1925; D. f. himalayana Jerdon, 1864; D. f. sarkari Kinnear & Whistler, 1930; D. f. assimilis Hume, 1877; D. f. sapiens (Deignan, 1955); D. f. sinica Stresemann, 1913; D. f. insulae Hartert, 1910

Synonyms
- D. himalayensis

= Grey treepie =

Species of bird

The grey treepie (Dendrocitta formosae), also known as the Himalayan treepie, is an Asian treepie, a medium-sized and long-tailed member of the crow family. The species was first described by Robert Swinhoe in 1863. They are widely distributed along the foothills of the Himalayas in the Indian subcontinent and extending into Indochina, Nepal, southern mainland China and Taiwan. The populations vary in plumage and several are named as subspecies.

Grey treepies are omnivorous birds mostly thriving among dense foliage and in forests. They sometimes take part in mixed species flocks with laughingthrushes, especially the white-throated laughingthrush. They systematically work together through the hill forests, rhododendrons, oaks and other broad-leaved trees, especially in the mornings.

== Description ==
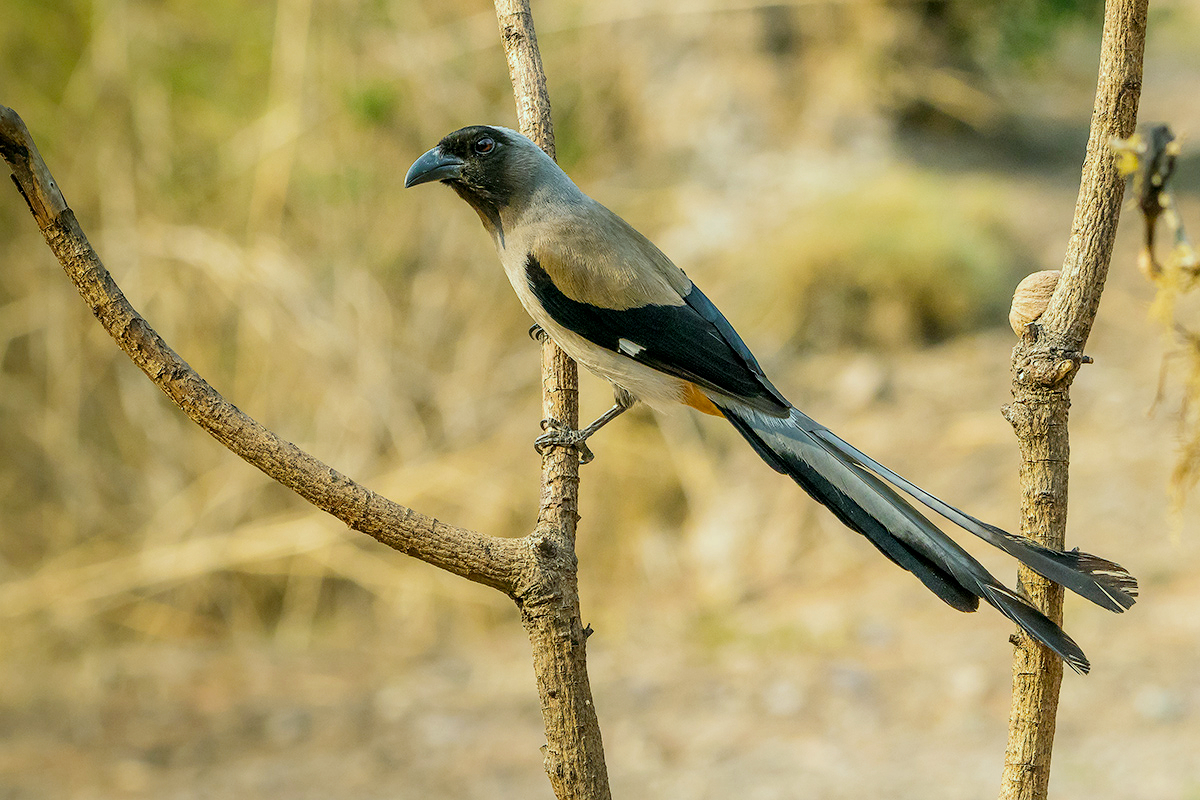
Grey treepie from Sattal India

The grey treepie is 36–40 cm (14–16 in) long and weighs 89–121 g (3.1–4.3 oz). It is the same size as other Dendrocitta species and is separated from them by the overall grey colour of the body. The races in the western part of the distribution have a greyish rump and some grey in tail while the eastern forms have a white rump and a black tail. The face and throat are dark and black with a diffuse mask. The body is grey on the underside becoming whiter towards the vent. The back and scapulars are brownish. The crown and nape are greyish and the black wing has a prominent white carpal patch. The vent is rufous and the outer tail feathers and tips of the central feathers are black. The beak is black, the legs are blackish-brown and the eyes are red or reddish-brown. The two sexes are similar. The juvenile bird is duller, with a browner nape, and all of its feathers have rufous tips.

The species occupies a large geographical range and has several recognised regional forms that differ slightly from one another for instance in colour and tail length. These include occidentalis of the western Himalayan foothills (identified by its slightly longer tail), himalayana from the central Himalayas east into Thailand and Vietnam. A disjunct population, said to have a smaller or narrower bill, is found in the Eastern Ghats of peninsular India, sarkari, that is sometimes subsumed into himalayana. The Southeast Asian races include assimilis, sapiens, sinica, formosae (the nominate race from Taiwan) and insulae (Hainan Island).

It has been suggested that this species forms a superspecies along with Dendrocitta occipitalis and Dendrocitta cinerascens.

== Distribution and habitat ==
The grey treepie is largely arboreal and is found in a wide range of habitats including forest, cultivation and human habitation. The distribution range includes the foothills of the Himalayas, the Eastern Ghats (India), Bangladesh, Myanmar, Thailand, China, Hainan, Taiwan and northern Indochina. In the Himalayas, it is found up to 2,400 m (7,900 ft) above sea level, and in southeastern China, it is found between 400 m (1,300 ft) and 1,200 m (3,900 ft).

== Behaviour and ecology ==
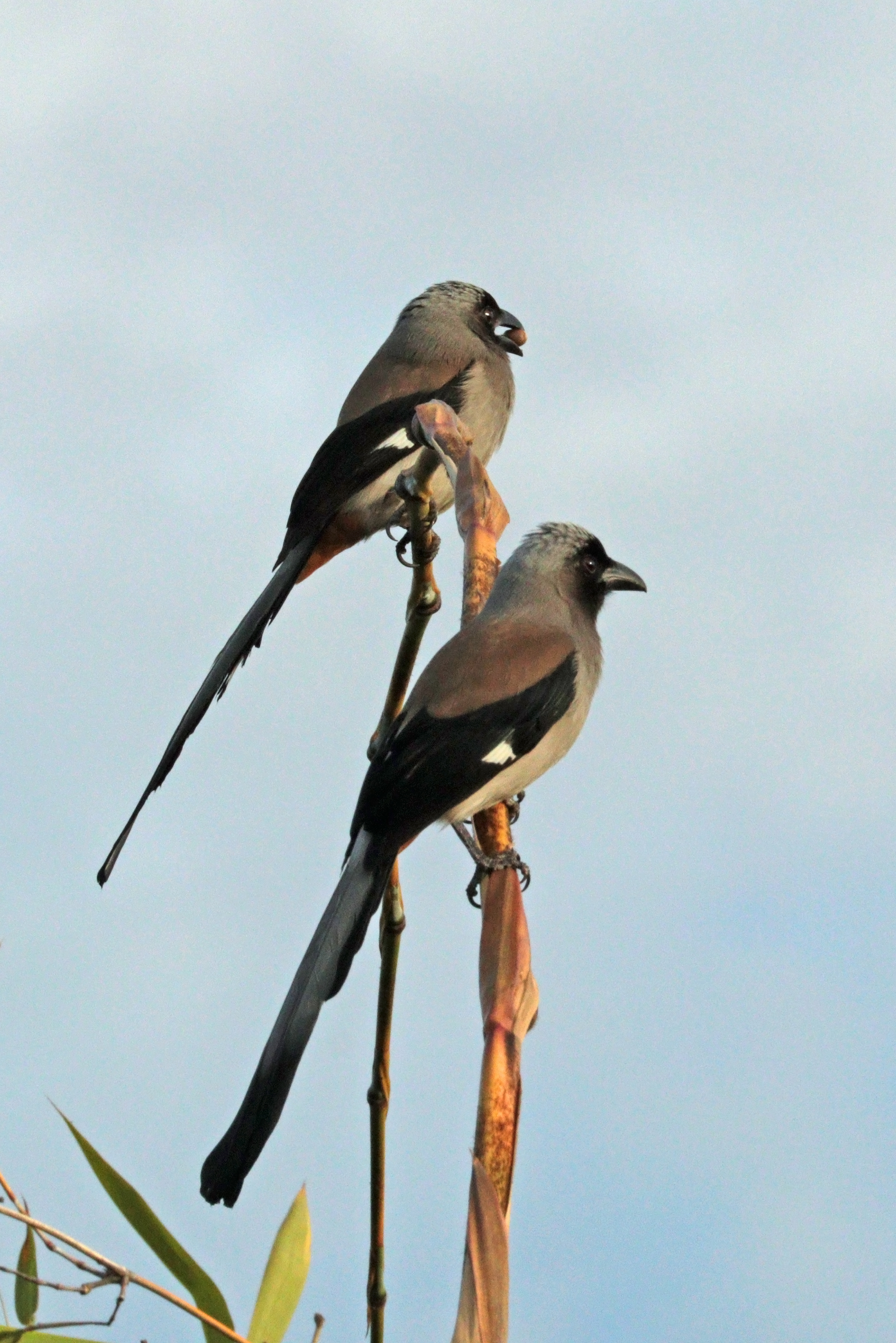
pair of D. f. himalayana Pokhara, Nepal

This treepie is mostly an arboreal feeder but will take some food from the ground, especially in cultivated regions. It eats a wide range of insects and other invertebrates, berries, nectar, grain and other seeds, and also small reptiles, eggs and nestlings. It sometimes joins mixed-species foraging flocks.

In the foothills of the Himalayas in Nepal, they are known to breed from 2000 to 6000 feet high mainly during the months of May to July. The nest is a shallow cup lined with hair and is built in trees and bushes or clumps of bamboo with 3-4 eggs per clutch. The eggs can be whitish, buffish or pale green, with brown or grey spots. Both the male and female build the nest and feed the young birds.

The voice is described as harsh and grating, but like other species is quite varied and includes a grating k-r-r-r-r sound as well as more melodious notes not unlike those of the rufous treepie. These include a tiddly-aye-kok, ko-ku-la and barking braap...braap...braap calls.

== Status ==
The global population size is not known. In China, there are an estimated 10,000 to 100,000 breeding pairs, and the population size in Taiwan is estimated at 10,000 to 100,000 breeding pairs. The population in Hainan may be endangered by habitat destruction. The species has a large range, and the population decline does not appear to be very rapid, so the IUCN Red List has assessed the species to be of least concern.
