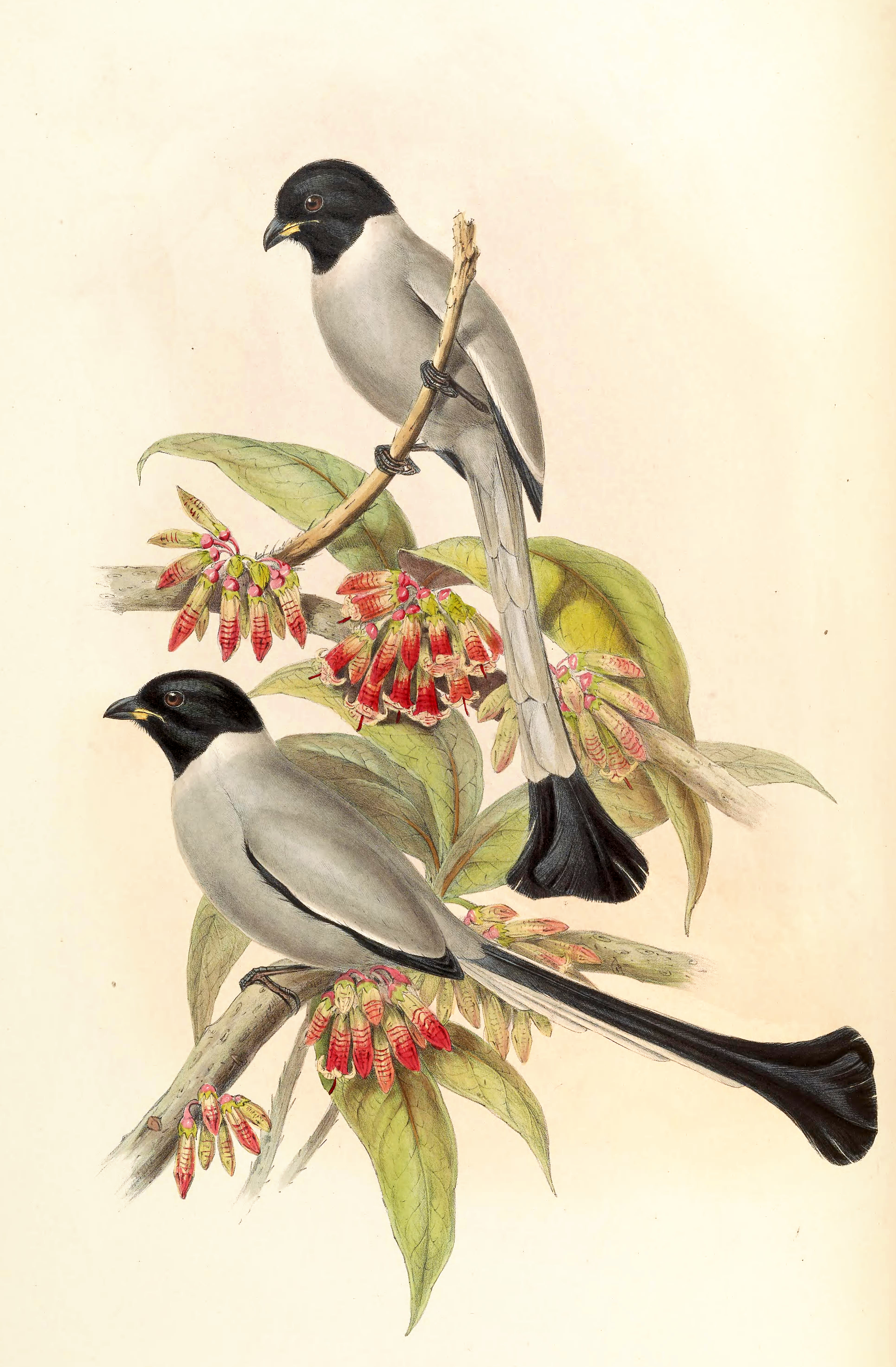
- Crypsirina cucullata

Scientific classification
- Kingdom: Animalia
- Phylum: Chordata
- Class: Aves
- Order: Passeriformes
- Family: Corvidae
- Subfamily: Crypsirininae
- Genus: Crypsirina; Vieillot, 1816

Type species
- Corvus varians Latham, 1801

Species
- C. temia; C. cucullata

= Crypsirina =

Genus of birds

Crypsirina is a small genus of long-tailed passerine birds in the crow and jay family, Corvidae. The two species are highly arboreal and rarely come to the ground to feed. The generic name is derived from the Greek words kruptō, meaning "to conceal," and rhis or rhinos, meaning "nostrils".

They are:

Genus Crypsirina – Vieillot, 1816 – two species
Common name	Scientific name and subspecies	Range	Size and ecology	IUCN status and estimated population
Racket-tailed treepie	Crypsirina temia (Daudin, 1800)	southern Burma (Myanmar), Thailand, Indo-China, Sumatra, Java and Bali	Size: Habitat: Diet:	LC
Hooded treepie	Crypsirina cucullata Jerdon, 1862	Burma	Size: Habitat: Diet:	NT

The racket-tailed treepie, formerly placed in Dendrocitta, is an all-black Southeast Asian species. The grey and black hooded treepie is endemic to Myanmar.
