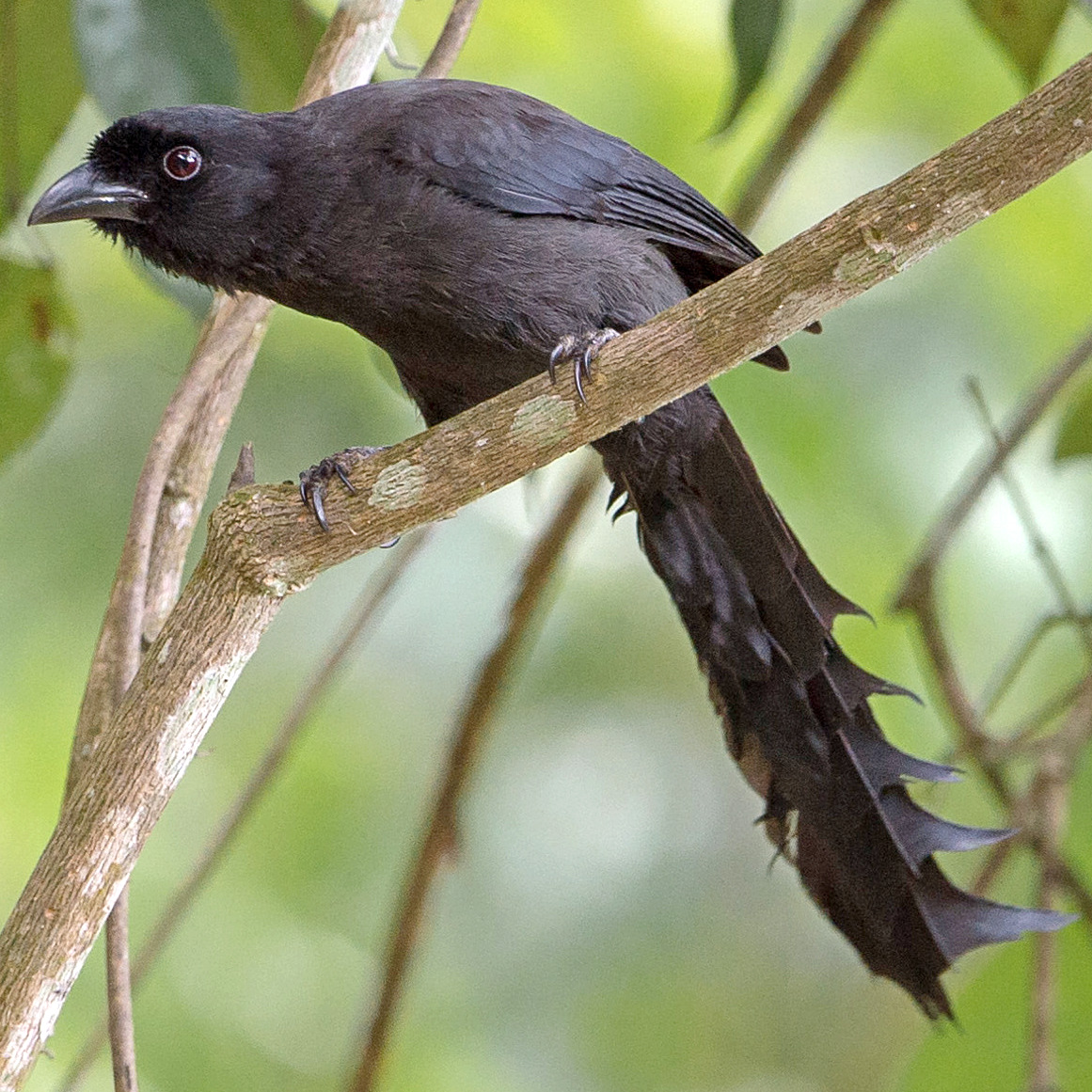
- In Kaeng Krachan National Park, Thailand

Conservation status
- Least Concern (IUCN 3.1)

Scientific classification
- Kingdom: Animalia
- Phylum: Chordata
- Class: Aves
- Order: Passeriformes
- Family: Corvidae
- Subfamily: Crypsirininae
- Genus: Temnurus; Lesson, 1831
- Species: T. temnurus

Binomial name
- Temnurus temnurus (Temminck, 1825)

= Ratchet-tailed treepie =

Species of bird

The ratchet-tailed treepie (Temnurus temnurus) is a species of bird in the crow and jay family Corvidae. The species is also known as the notch-tailed treepie. It is monotypic within the genus Temnurus. This corvid is found in southeast Asia.

== Taxonomy ==
The ratchet-tailed treepie was first formally described as Glaucopis temnura in 1825 by the Dutch zoologist Coenraad Jacob Temminck with its type locality given as Cochinchina. In 1831 René Lesson described a new species, Temnurus truncatus, also from Cochinchina and placed it in the new genus, Temnurus, the name Temminck used was preoccuppied by Glaucopis Hübner, 1818 in Lepidoptera. Temnurus truncatus is now regarded as a synonym of Temminck's Glaucopis temnura. The genus Temnurus is monospecific and is classified in the subfamily Crypsirininae, the treepies, within the family Corvidae, which includes the crows, jays and related species.

== Description ==
The ratchet-tailed treepie resembles the racket-tailed treepie (Crypsirina tenuis) but is distinguished from it by its long, wide tail which has spikes projecting from the outer webs of its feathers. The overall colour is greyish-black with a blck face with dark red to brown eyes. Immatures have a less developed tail than adults. This species has atotal length of 32 to 35.5 cm (12.6 to 14.0 in), including 18 cm (7.1 in) of tail. The common calls are rather screechy "klee" and "klee-aw", with some squawking calls.

== Distribution and habitat ==
The ratchet-tailed treepie has a disjunct distribution in Southeast Asia and China. One population is found in southern Thailand, another in southern Vietnam, another in central and northern Vietnam and Laos, and the last in Hainan in China. Its natural habitat is tropical moist broadleaf evergreen lowland forests, and secondary forest and scrubland.

== Biology ==
The ratchet-tailed treepie is found in small family groups, in which the adults perform duets. They nest between April and June with 2 eggs being laid in a shallow cup among bamboo.
