= Black jay =

Black jay is a common name which can refer to two birds in the infraorder Corvides, of the order Passeriformes:

- In Tasmania it is the local name for the black currawong (Strepera fuliginosa) of the family Artamidae.
- Black magpies, in the genus Platysmurus, from Borneo, Sumatra, Malaysia, and southern Thailand.
