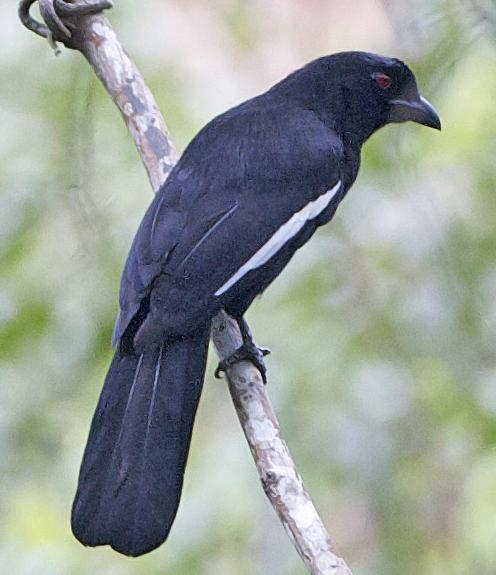

Conservation status
- Least Concern (IUCN 3.1)

Scientific classification
- Kingdom: Animalia
- Phylum: Chordata
- Class: Aves
- Order: Passeriformes
- Family: Corvidae
- Genus: Platysmurus
- Species: P. leucopterus

Binomial name
- Platysmurus leucopterus (Temminck, 1824)

= Malayan black magpie =

Species of bird

The Malayan black magpie (Platysmurus leucopterus) is a species of bird in the family Corvidae. Despite its name, it is neither a magpie nor, as was long believed, a jay, but a treepie. Treepies are a distinct group of corvids externally similar to magpies.

== Distribution and habitat ==
It is found in Brunei, Indonesia, Malaysia, Myanmar, Singapore, and Thailand. The Bornean black magpie (P. atterimus) was formerly considered a subspecies. The natural habitats of the Malayan black magpie are subtropical or tropical moist lowland forest and subtropical or tropical mangrove forest. It is threatened by habitat loss.
