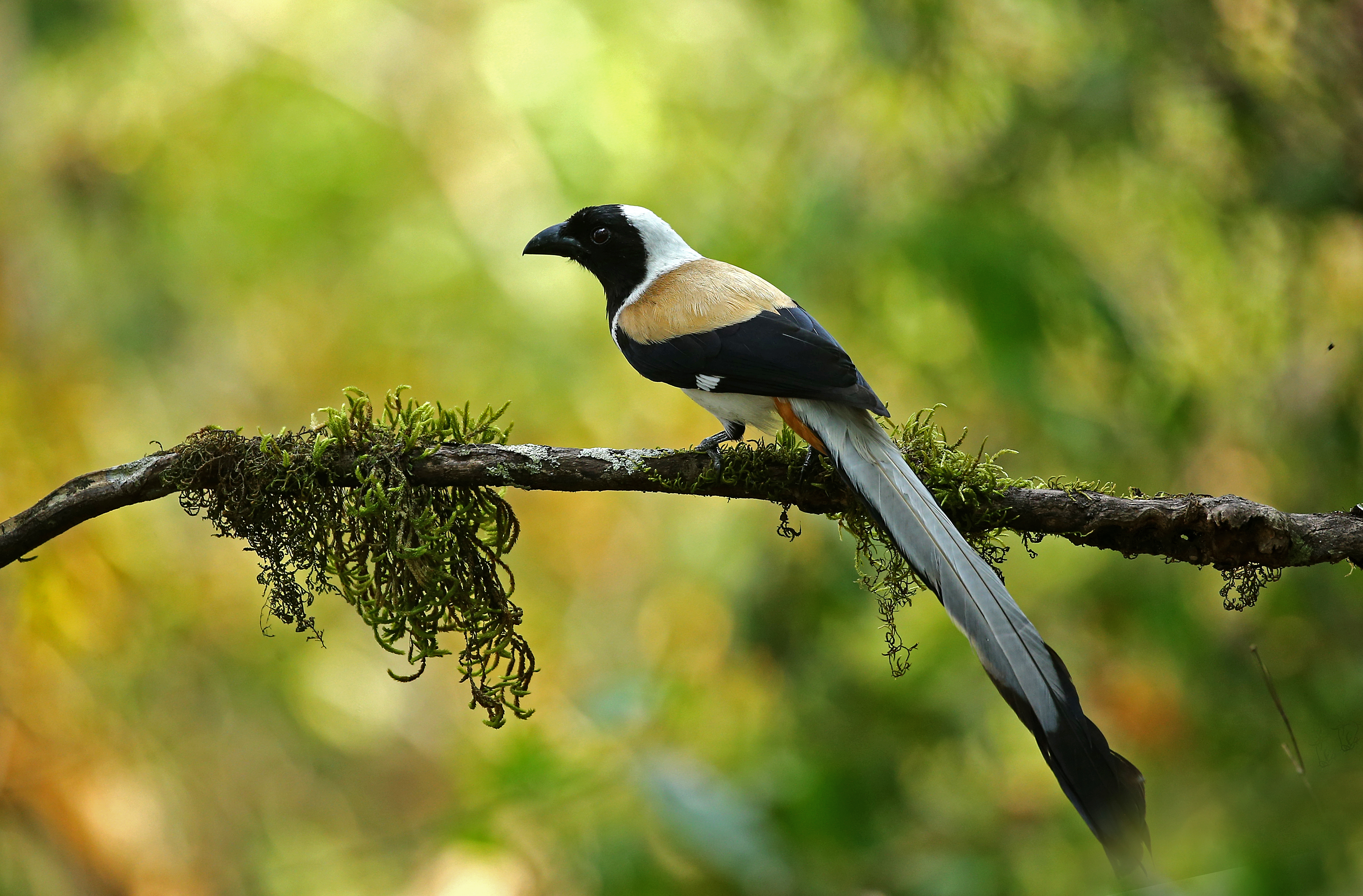

Conservation status
- Least Concern (IUCN 3.1)

Scientific classification
- Kingdom: Animalia
- Phylum: Chordata
- Class: Aves
- Order: Passeriformes
- Family: Corvidae
- Genus: Dendrocitta
- Species: D. leucogastra

Binomial name
- Dendrocitta leucogastra Gould, 1833
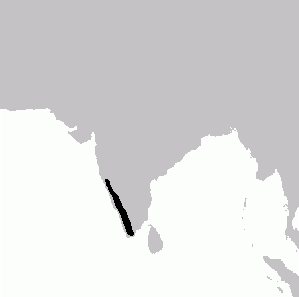

Audio
- Calls

= White-bellied treepie =

Species of bird

The white-bellied treepie (Dendrocitta leucogastra) is a bird of the crow family endemic to the forests of southern India. They overlap in distribution in some areas with the rufous treepie but are easy to tell apart both from appearance and call.

== Description ==
The white of the head and body makes it easy to distinguish from the sympatric rufous treepie. This tends to be found in more dense forest and is less associated with human habitation than the rufous treepie. The white-bellied treepie is 48 cm (19 in) long. The back of the neck is white, and the throat and breast are black. The thighs are black, and the undertail coverts are chestnut. The rest of the underparts is white. The back is chestnut-brown. The wings are black and have a white patch. The rump is white. Two-thirds of the two central tail feathers are silver-grey, and the terminal third is black. The other tail feathers are black. The beak is black, and the legs are greyish-black.

== Distribution ==
It is found in the forests of the Western Ghats mainly south of Goa. A record from Erimalai near Dharmapuri and reports from the Surat Dangs and the southeastern Ghats of Andhra Pradesh stand outside its main distribution range. A record from central India (Chikalda, Gawilgarh) has been questioned.

== Behaviour and ecology ==
The white-bellied treepie eats fruits, seeds, nectar, invertebrates, reptiles, rodents, nestlings and eggs. When calling, the bird bows and droops its wings. Several birds may arrive at one tree and call repeatedly during the pre-monsoon breeding season (mainly April–May but some nests from February). The nest is a platform of twigs on a medium-sized tree. Three eggs are laid, ashy grey with green and grey blotches.

It is associated with mixed-species foraging flocks and is often found along with greater racket-tailed drongos.

== Gallery ==
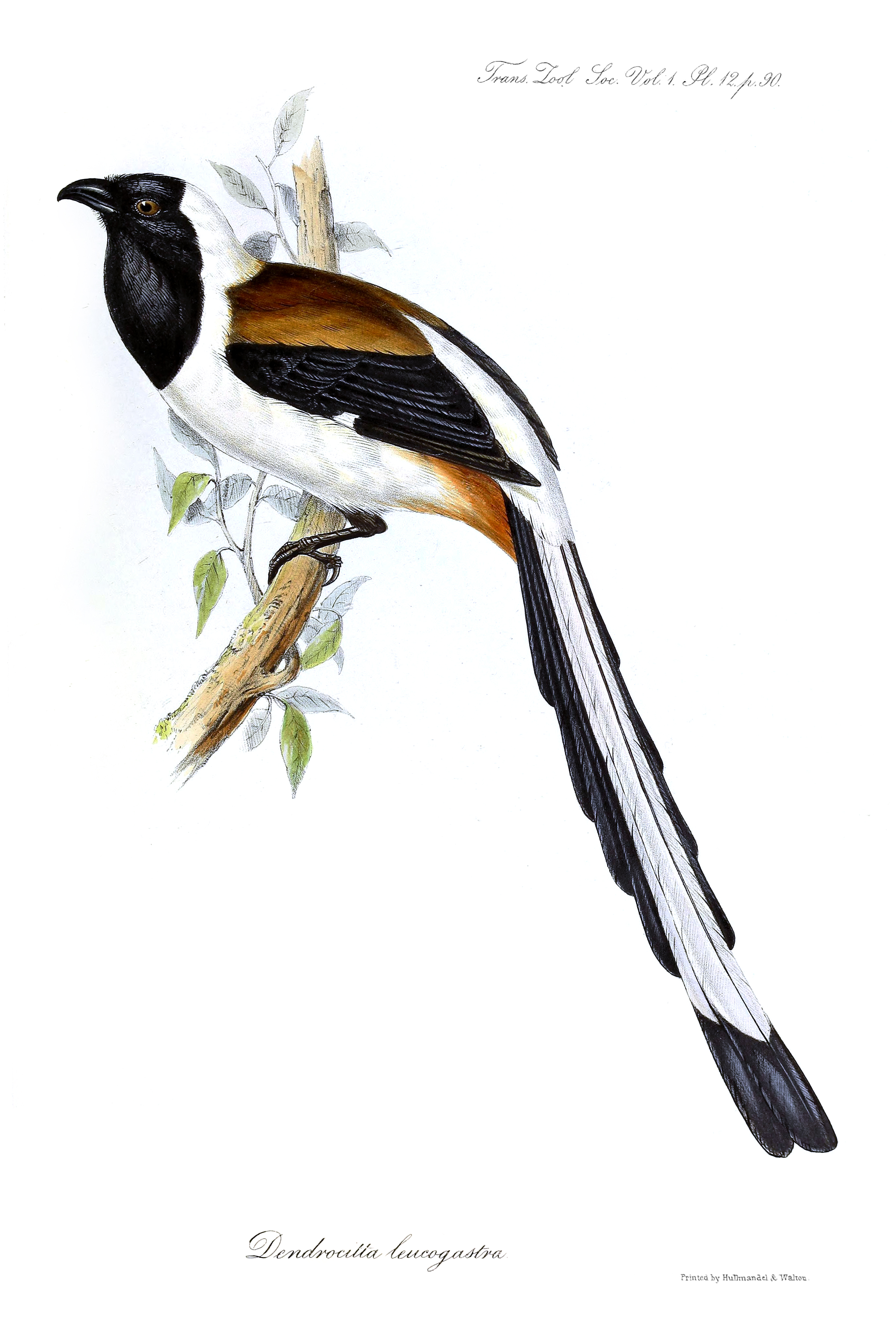
Illustration by John Gould attached to his species description

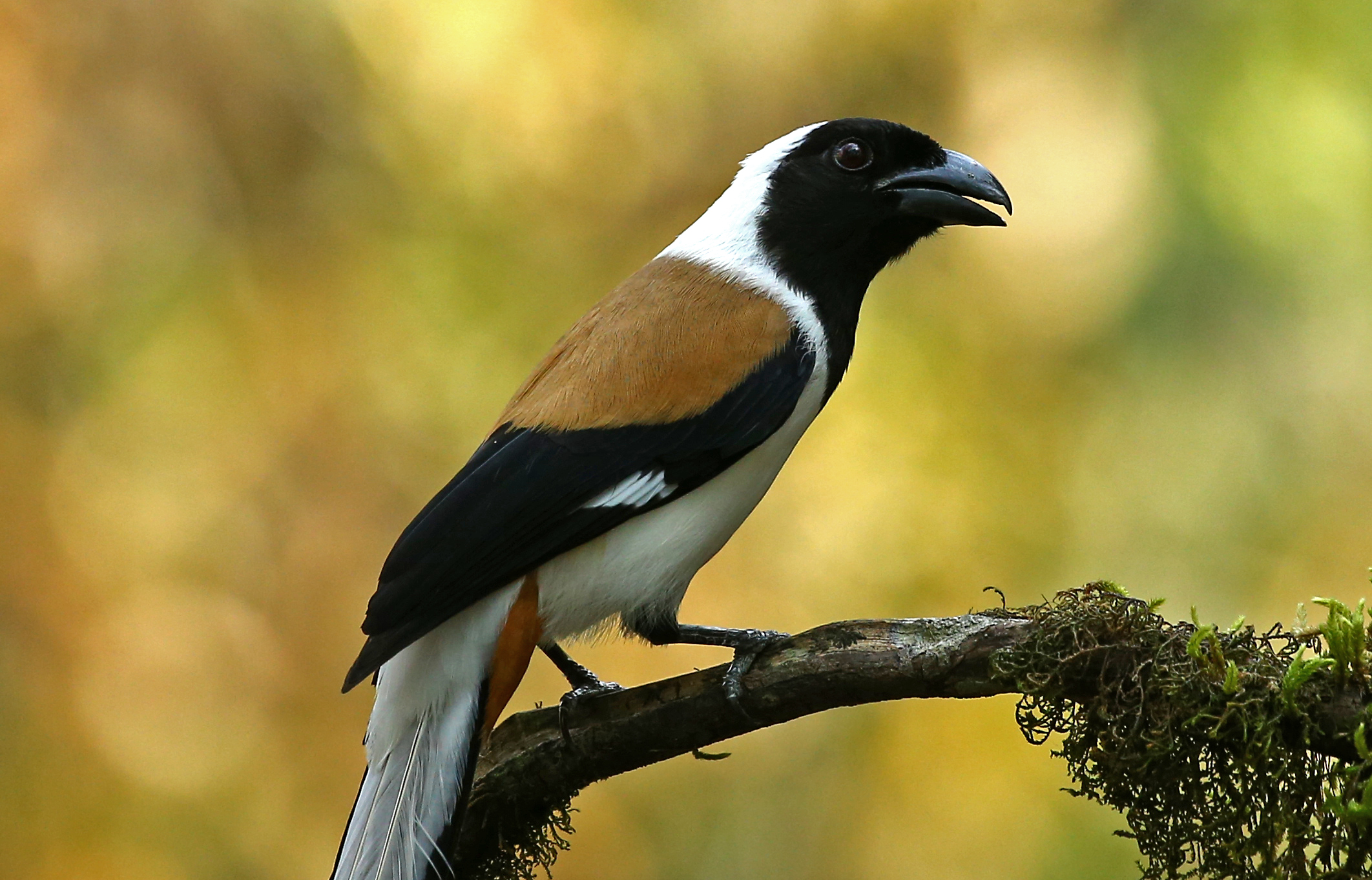
Close-up

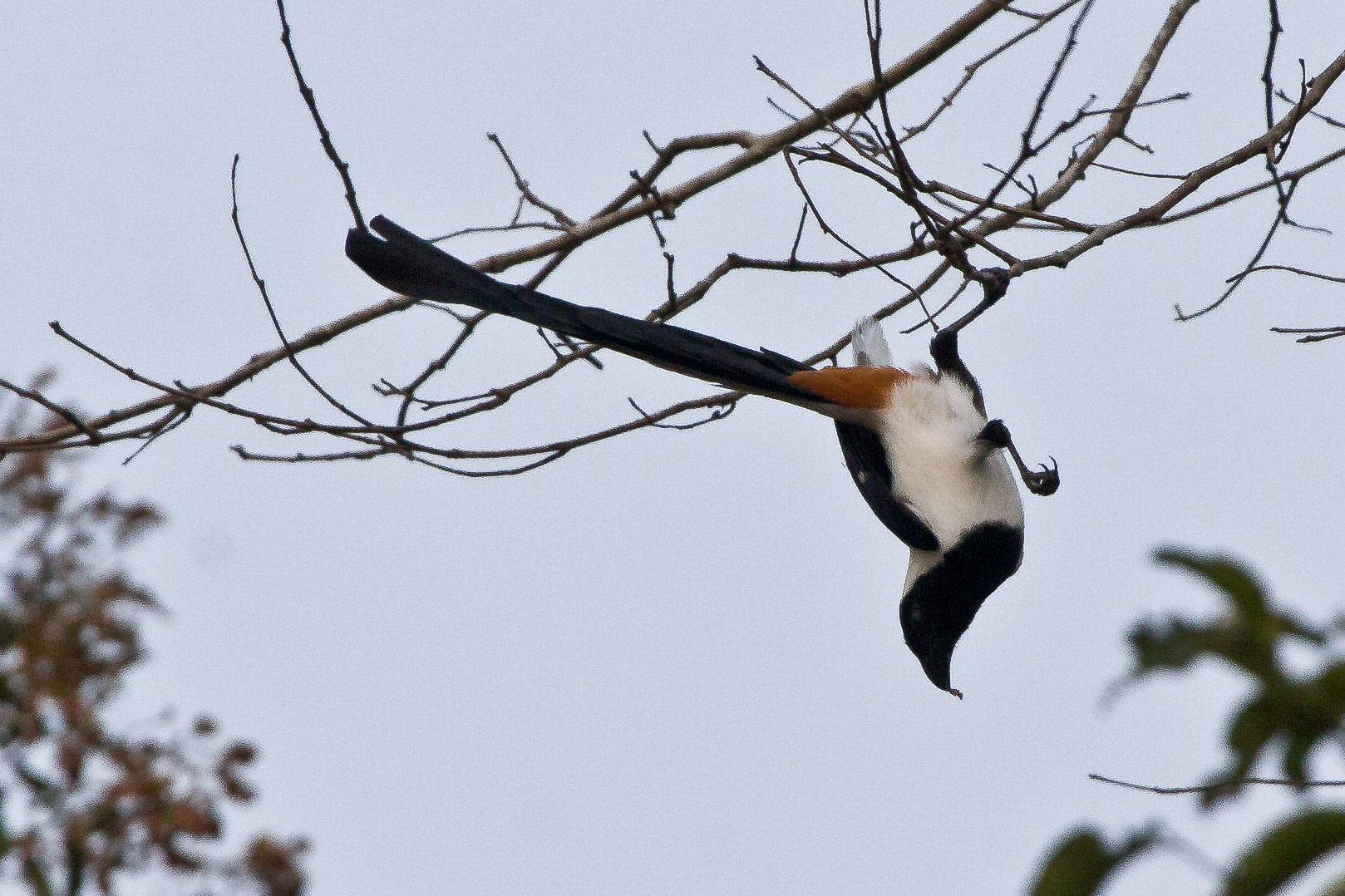
In Thattekad Bird Sanctuary

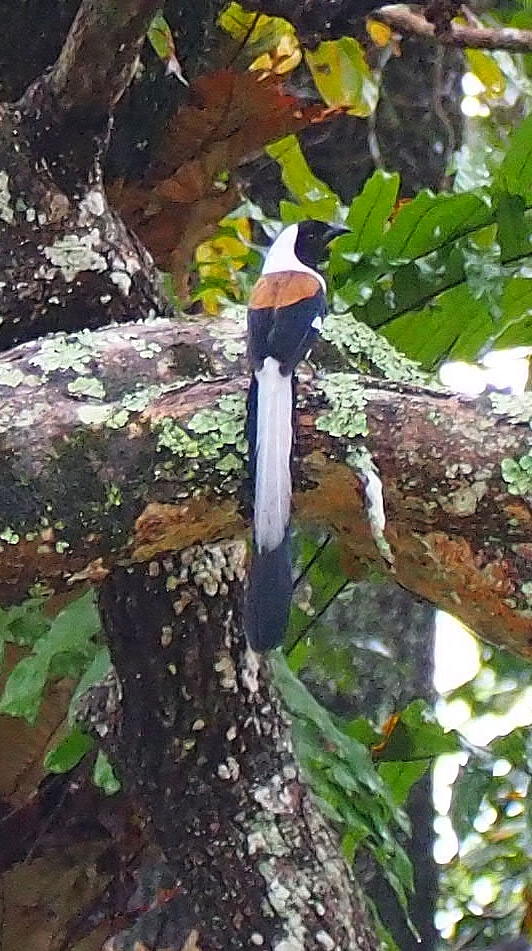
Dorsal view, in Parambikulam Tiger Reserve
