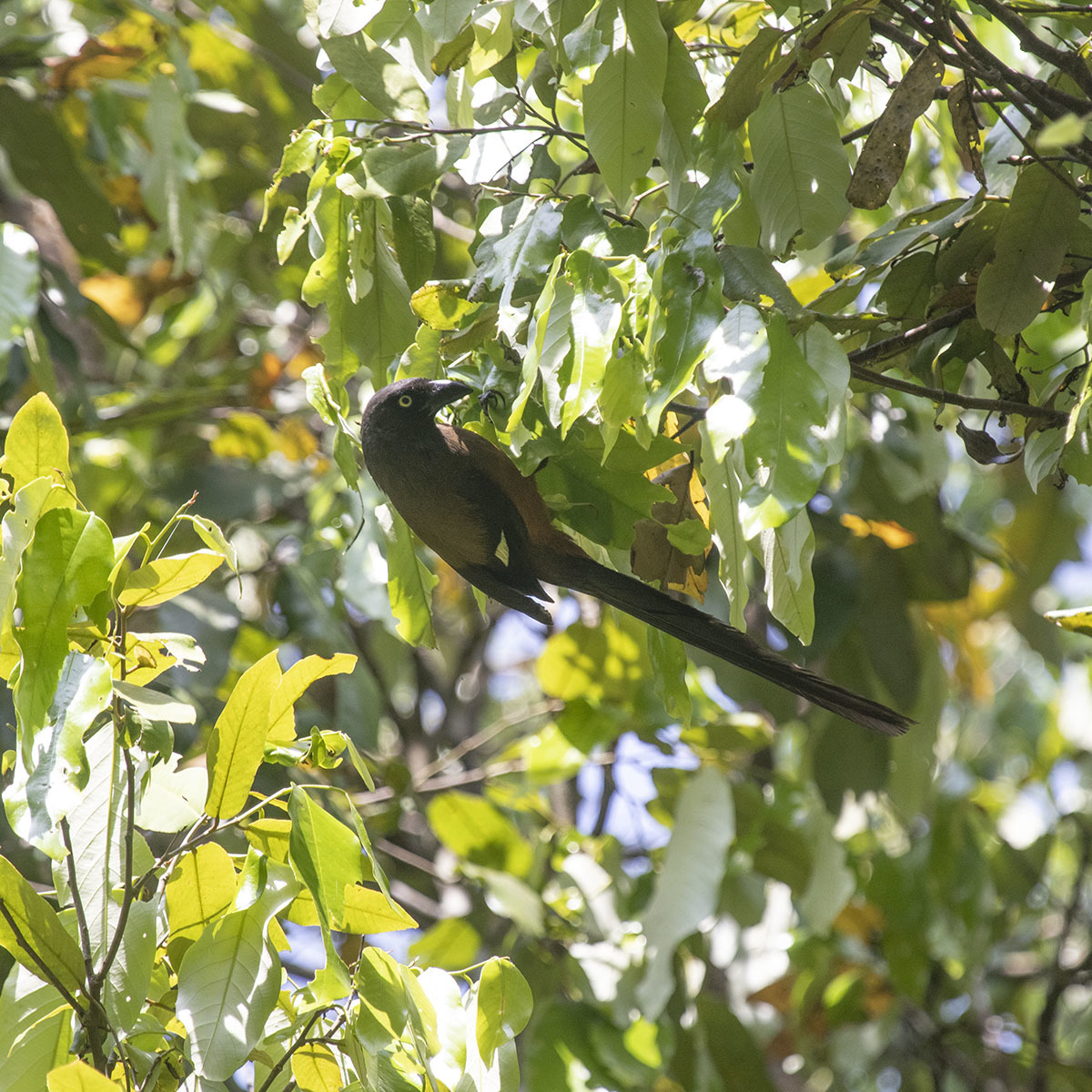

Conservation status
- Vulnerable (IUCN 3.1)

Scientific classification
- Kingdom: Animalia
- Phylum: Chordata
- Class: Aves
- Order: Passeriformes
- Family: Corvidae
- Genus: Dendrocitta
- Species: D. bayleii

Binomial name
- Dendrocitta bayleii Tytler, 1863

Synonyms
- Dendrocitta bayleyi

= Andaman treepie =

Species of bird

The Andaman treepie (Dendrocitta bayleii) is a species of bird in the family Corvidae. First described by Robert Christopher Tytler in 1863, it is endemic to the Andaman Islands of India, where its natural habitat is dense tropical moist lowland forest, where it typically is found near the largest trees. It is threatened by habitat loss caused by logging in its restricted range.

The Andaman treepie is the smallest species of treepie, 32 cm (13 in) in length and weighing between 92–113 g (3.2–4.0 oz). The head and neck are blueish grey, the wings and long tail are black, with a white spot on the wings, the lower breast and belly are rufous. The large bill is blackish.

The scientific name commemorates the Anglo-Indian statesman Edward Clive Bayley.
