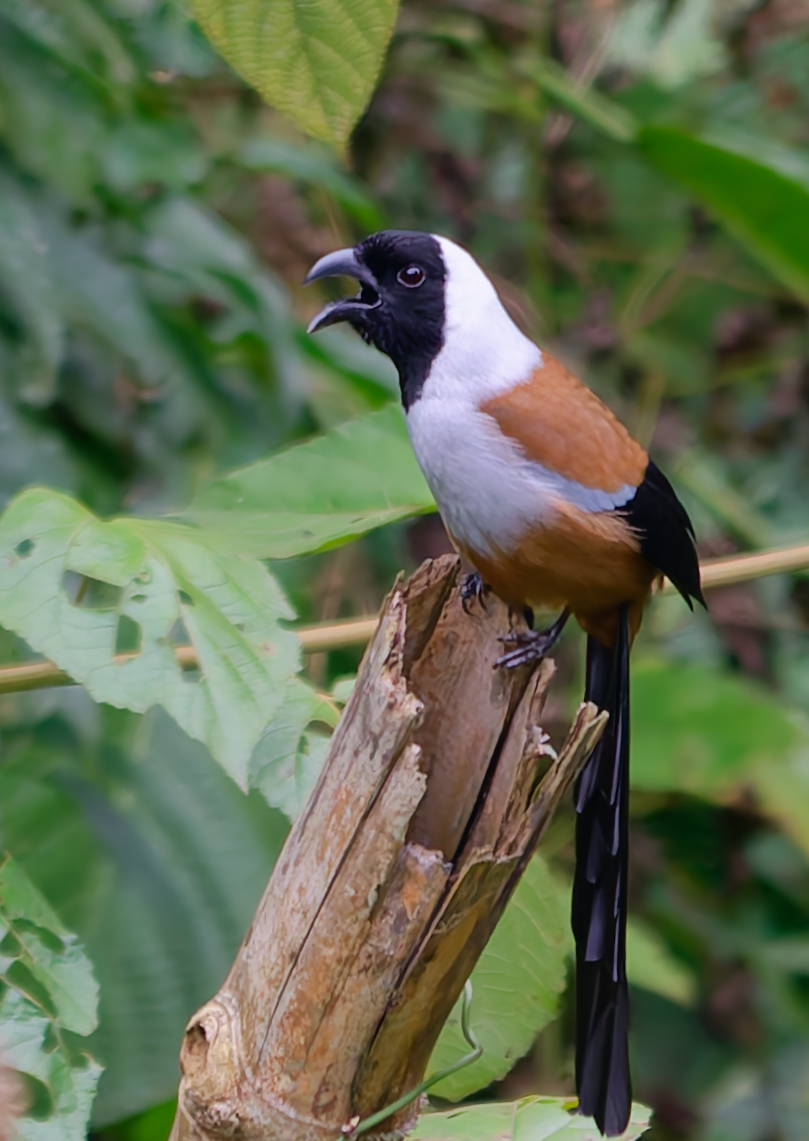
- In Namdapha National Park, India

Conservation status
- Least Concern (IUCN 3.1)

Scientific classification
- Kingdom: Animalia
- Phylum: Chordata
- Class: Aves
- Order: Passeriformes
- Family: Corvidae
- Genus: Dendrocitta
- Species: D. frontalis

Binomial name
- Dendrocitta frontalis Horsfield, 1840

= Collared treepie =

Species of bird

The collared treepie (Dendrocitta frontalis), also known as black-faced treepie or black-browed treepie, is an Asian treepie, a small perching bird of the crow family, Corvidae.

This bird is slightly smaller than a blue jay and has the typical compact body and long tail of this group. The forehead, face and bib are black with the chest, neck and shoulders a light silvery or bluish-grey in color. The back is a warm chestnut brown with similar underparts. The wing coverts are white with the primaries and tail black.

It inhabits a broad band (though often very localized) from the north eastern Indian Himalayas, Bangladesh, Nepal and across into Burma (Myanmar) in hill forests often at quite high elevations.

It feeds mainly on invertebrates of various types, and hawks for termites in flight; it also eats fruits and berries. It probably takes similar overall food types as the other treepies.

The nest is a small, neat structure often placed in bamboo clumps, small trees or bushes at the edge of a clearing. There are usually 3-5 eggs laid.

The voice is described as varied but contains metallic notes as well as the chatter alarm call sounding similar to the other species.
