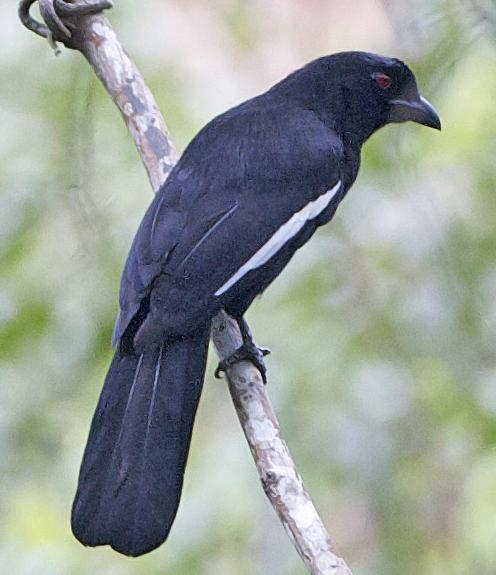
- Malayan black magpie

Scientific classification
- Kingdom: Animalia
- Phylum: Chordata
- Class: Aves
- Order: Passeriformes
- Family: Corvidae
- Subfamily: Crypsirininae
- Genus: Platysmurus; Reichenbach, 1850

Type species
- Glaucopis leucopterus Temminck, 1824

= Platysmurus =

Genus of birds

Platysmurus is a genus of treepie in the family Corvidae.

It contains the following species:

Genus Platysmurus – Reichenbach, 1850 – two species
Common name	Scientific name and subspecies	Range	Size and ecology	IUCN status and estimated population
Malayan black magpie	Platysmurus leucopterus (Temminck, 1824)	Brunei, Indonesia, Malaysia, Myanmar, Singapore, and Thailand.	Size: Habitat: Diet:	LC
Bornean black magpie	Platysmurus aterrimus (Lesson, 1831)	Borneo	Size: Habitat: Diet:	LC
