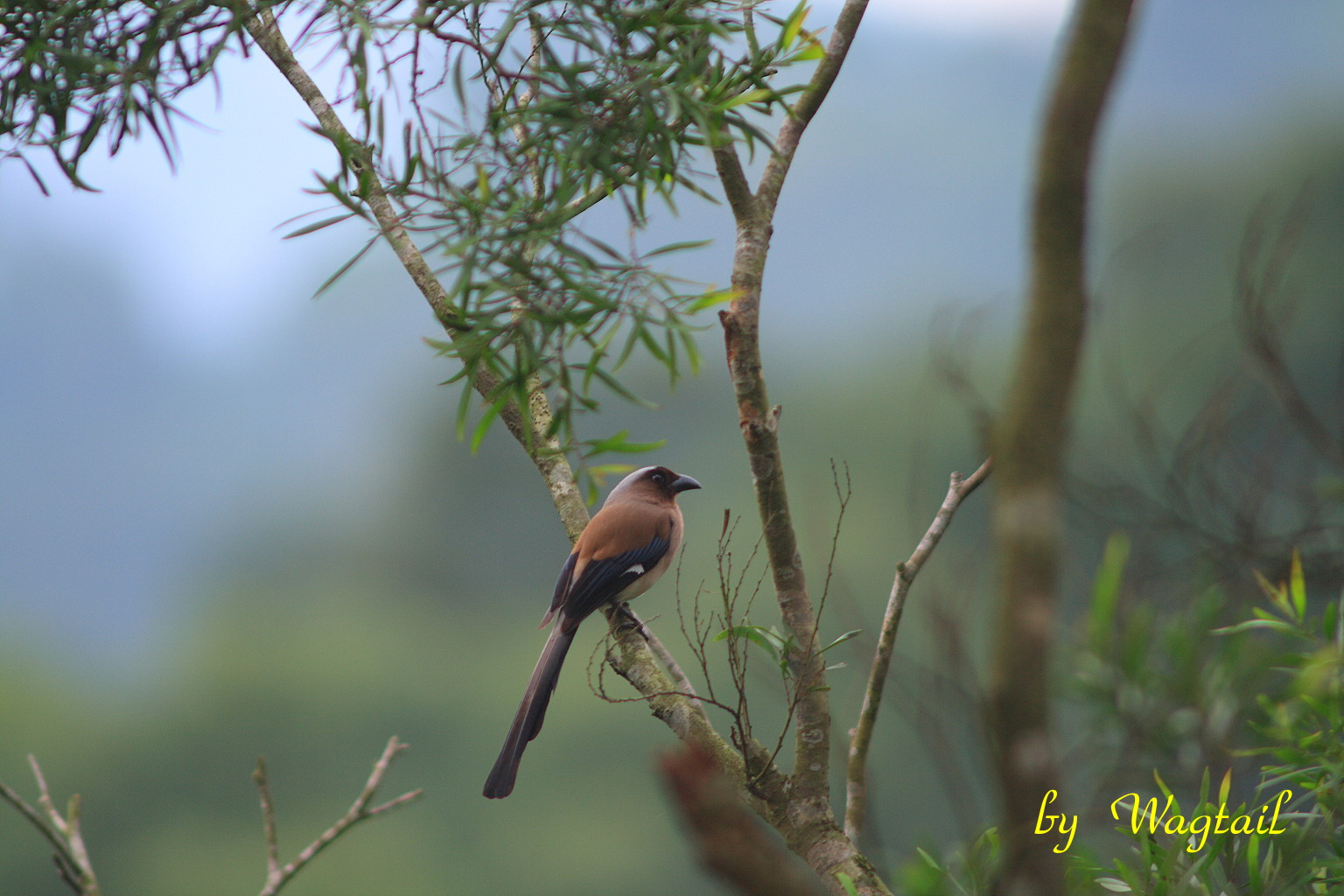
- Grey treepie (Dendrocitta formosae)

Scientific classification
- Kingdom: Animalia
- Phylum: Chordata
- Class: Aves
- Order: Passeriformes
- Family: Corvidae
- Subfamily: Crypsirininae
- Genus: Dendrocitta; Gould, 1833

Type species
- Dendrocitta leucogastra Gould, 1833

Species
- 7, see text

= Dendrocitta =

Genus of birds

Dendrocitta is a genus of long-tailed passerine birds in the crow and jay family, Corvidae. They are resident in tropical South and Southeast Asia.

The species have black, grey and rufous plumage. Typically, the face and flight feathers are black, and the back is rufous. They are highly arboreal and rarely come to the ground to feed.

== Taxonomy ==
The genus Dendrocitta was introduced in 1833 by the English ornithologist John Gould with the type species as Dendrocitta leucogastra Gould, 1833, the white-bellied treepie. The genus name combines the Ancient Greek δενδρον/dendron meaning "tree" with κιττα/kitta meaning "magpie".

The genus contains seven species:

| Image | Common name | Scientific name | Distribution |
|---|---|---|---|
| | Rufous treepie | Dendrocitta vagabunda | Indian subcontinent and adjoining parts of Southeast Asia |
| | Grey treepie | Dendrocitta formosae | Himalayas, Indochina, southern mainland China, Hainan and Taiwan |
| | Sumatran treepie | Dendrocitta occipitalis | mountains of Sumatra |
| | Bornean treepie | Dendrocitta cinerascens | mountains of Borneo |
| | White-bellied treepie | Dendrocitta leucogastra | lowlands of southwestern India (Western Ghats) |
| | Collared treepie | Dendrocitta frontalis | Himalayas of northern India, northern Myanmar, and northwestern Vietnam |
| | Andaman treepie | Dendrocitta bayleii | dense forest of Andaman Islands |
