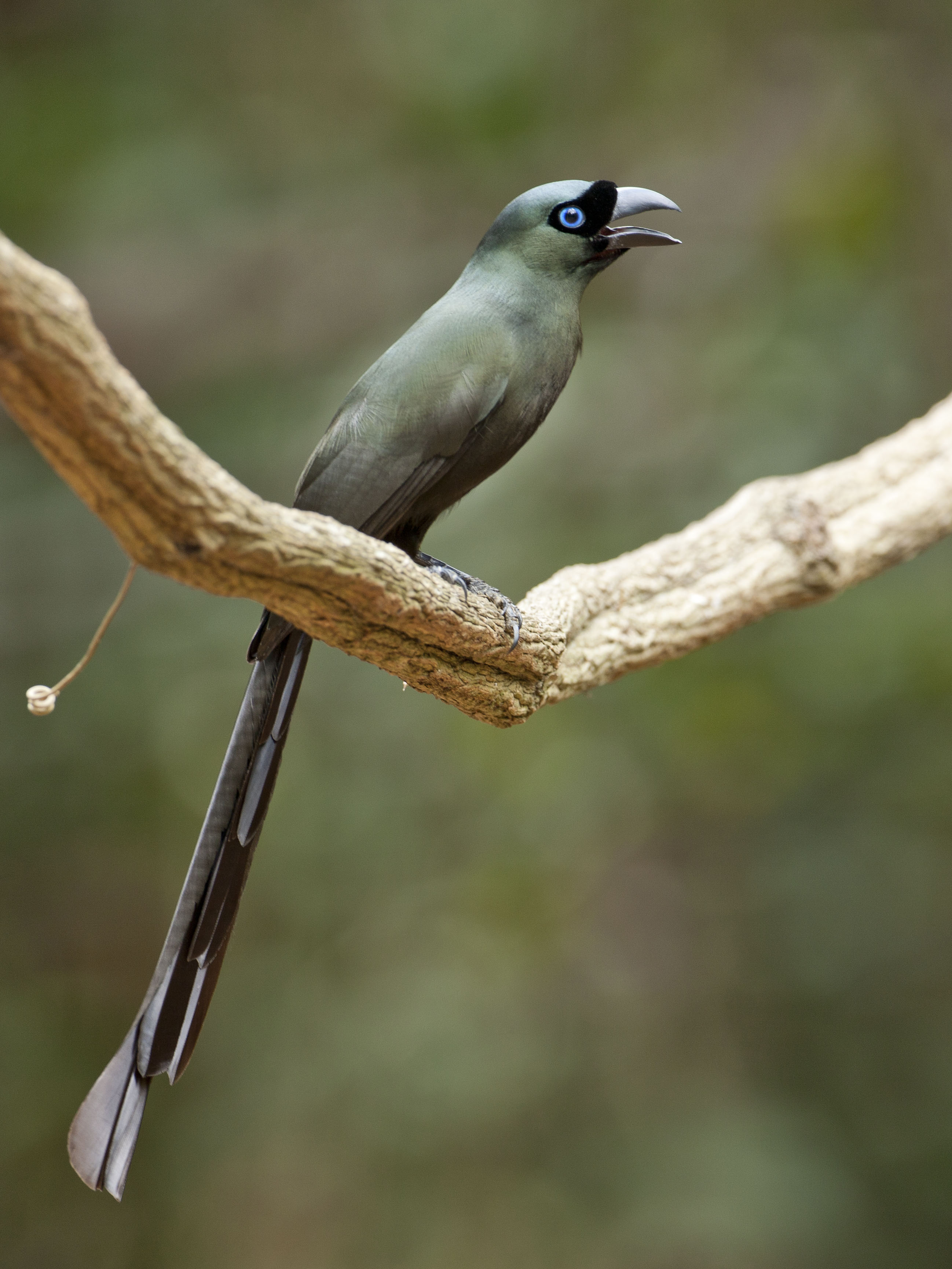
- In Kaeng Krachan National Park, Thailand

Conservation status
- Least Concern (IUCN 3.1)

Scientific classification
- Kingdom: Animalia
- Phylum: Chordata
- Class: Aves
- Order: Passeriformes
- Family: Corvidae
- Genus: Crypsirina
- Species: C. temia

Binomial name
- Crypsirina temia (Daudin, 1800)

= Racket-tailed treepie =

Species of bird

The racket-tailed treepie (Crypsirina temia) is an Asian treepie, a member of the crow family, Corvidae.

It has a velvety-black forehead of short, plush black feathers with the rest of the bird being an oily green colour, though appearing black in dim light. The tail feathers which in this species are long and broaden at the tail's end are black also with a greenish tinge, as are the wings. The iris of the bird is a turquoise-blue darkening towards the pupil to a very deep or near black. The bill, legs and feet are black.

This bird occurs in southern Burma (Myanmar), Thailand, Indo-China, Sumatra, Java and Bali in scrub and secondary growth, open fields and gardens, bamboo thickets and open forest often near villages.

It almost always feeds in trees (arboreal) never feeding from the ground though coming down to bathe on occasion. It moves through the trees with great agility and uses its remarkable tail as a balancing organ. It eats mainly insects and fruit.

A cup shaped nest is built in bamboo or shrubs especially thorny ones often surrounded by open grassy areas and normally lays 2–4 eggs.

The voice is usually described as harsh and unattractive. It has several described calls but a whining call is often heard.
