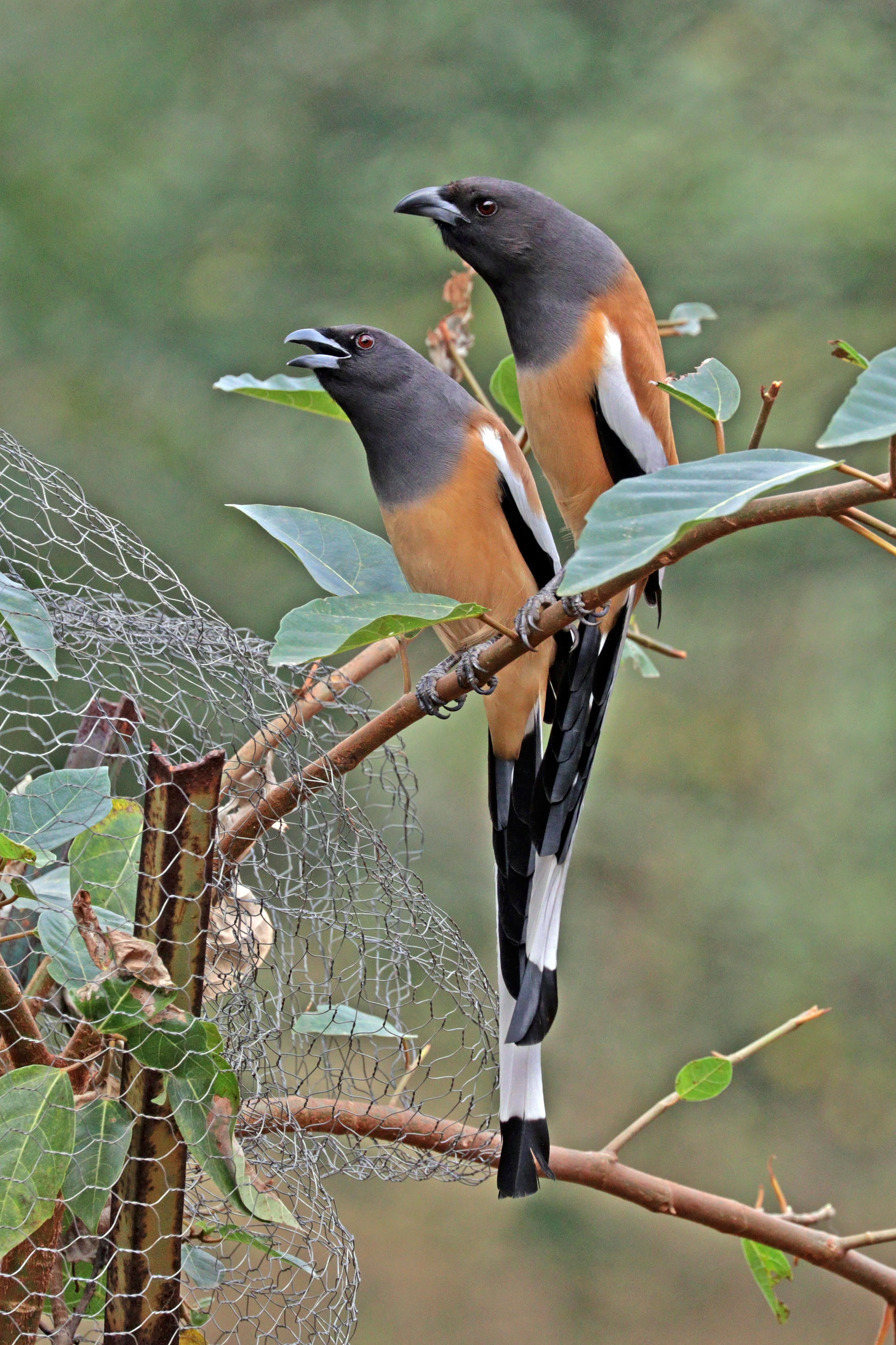
- Pair in Udaipur Rufuous treepie calling

Conservation status
- Least Concern (IUCN 3.1)

Scientific classification
- Kingdom: Animalia
- Phylum: Chordata
- Class: Aves
- Order: Passeriformes
- Family: Corvidae
- Genus: Dendrocitta
- Species: D. vagabunda

Binomial name
- Dendrocitta vagabunda (Latham, 1790)

Synonyms
- Dendrocitta rufa

= Rufous treepie =

Species of bird

The rufous treepie (Dendrocitta vagabunda) is a treepie, native to the Indian subcontinent and adjoining parts of Southeast Asia. It is a member of the crow family, Corvidae. It is long tailed and has loud musical calls making it very conspicuous. It is found commonly in open scrub, agricultural areas, forests as well as urban gardens. Like other corvids it is very adaptable, omnivorous and opportunistic in feeding.

== Description ==
The sexes are alike and the main colour of the body is cinnamon with a black head and the long graduated tail is bluish grey and is tipped in black. The wing has a white patch. The only confusable species is the grey treepie which however lacks the bright rufous mantle. The bill is stout with a hooked tip. The underparts and lower back are a warm tawny-brown to orange-brown in colour with white wing coverts and black primaries. The bill, legs and feet are black.

The widespread populations show variations and several subspecies are recognized. The nominate subspecies is found in the northeastern part of peninsular India south to Hyderabad. The desert form is paler and called pallida, vernayi of the Eastern Ghats is brighter while parvula of the Western Ghats is smaller in size. The form in Afghanistan and Pakistan is bristoli while the form in southern Thailand is saturatior. E. C. Stuart Baker describes sclateri from the upper Chindwin to the Chin Hills and kinneari from southern Myanmar and northwest Thailand. The population in eastern Thailand an Indochina is sakeratensis.

== Distribution and habitat ==
The range of the rufous treepie is quite large, covering Pakistan, India and into Bangladesh, Myanmar, Laos, and Thailand. It inhabits open forest consisting of scrub, plantations and gardens. In the Garhwal Himalayas, it migrates seasonally between different elevations.

== Behaviour and ecology ==
The rufous treepie has a wide repertoire of calls, but a bob-o-link or ko-tree call is most common. A local name for this bird kotri is derived from the typical call while other names include Handi Chancha and taka chor (="coin thief").

=== Diet ===
The rufous treepie is primarily an arboreal omnivore feeding on invertebrates, small reptiles and the eggs and young of birds, seeds, fruits and nectar of Bombax ceiba. Its feeds on the fruits of Trichosanthes tricuspidata, which are toxic to mammals. It also feeds on carcass and is an agile forager, clinging and clambering through the branches and sometimes joining mixed-species feeding flocks along with species such as drongos and babblers. They are known to be a cleaning symbiont of deer, feeding on ectoparasites of sambar deer, which permit them to perch and position themselves to invite the birds to examine specific parts. Like many other corvids, it caches food. It is considered to be beneficial to palm cultivation in southern India due to its foraging on the grubs of the destructive weevil Rhynchophorus ferrugineus.

=== Reproduction ===
The breeding season in India is April to June. In Bengal, the peak is in April and May with heightened levels of pineal gland activity and serotonin production. It builds its shallow nest in trees and bushes and usually lays 3-5 eggs.

=== Health ===
A blood parasitic protozoan Trypanosoma corvi and Babesia has been reported from this species. Trematode parasites, Haplorchis vagabundi, have been found in their intestines. An acanthocephalan parasite Centrorhynchus lancea is also known. A species of quill mite Syringophiloidus dendrocittae is known to live in the feathers of rufous treepies.
