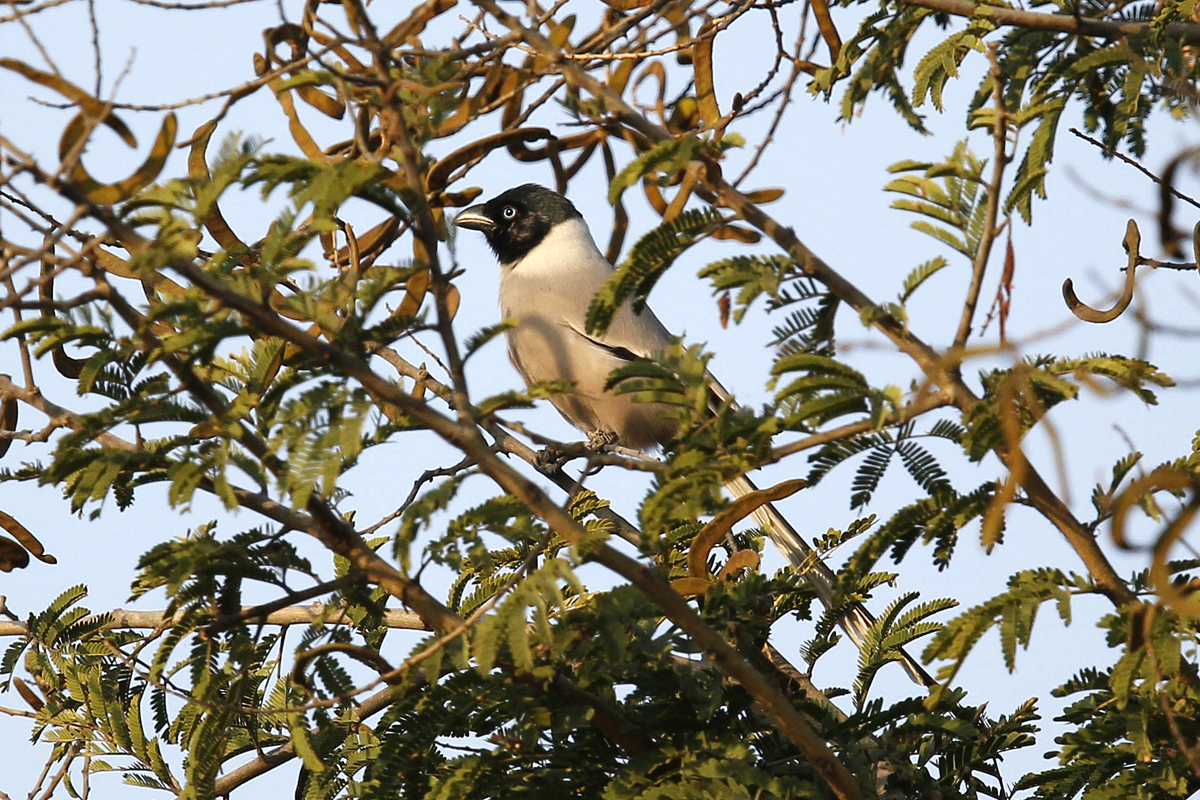

Conservation status
- Near Threatened (IUCN 3.1)

Scientific classification
- Kingdom: Animalia
- Phylum: Chordata
- Class: Aves
- Order: Passeriformes
- Family: Corvidae
- Genus: Crypsirina
- Species: C. cucullata

Binomial name
- Crypsirina cucullata Jerdon, 1862

= Hooded treepie =

Species of bird

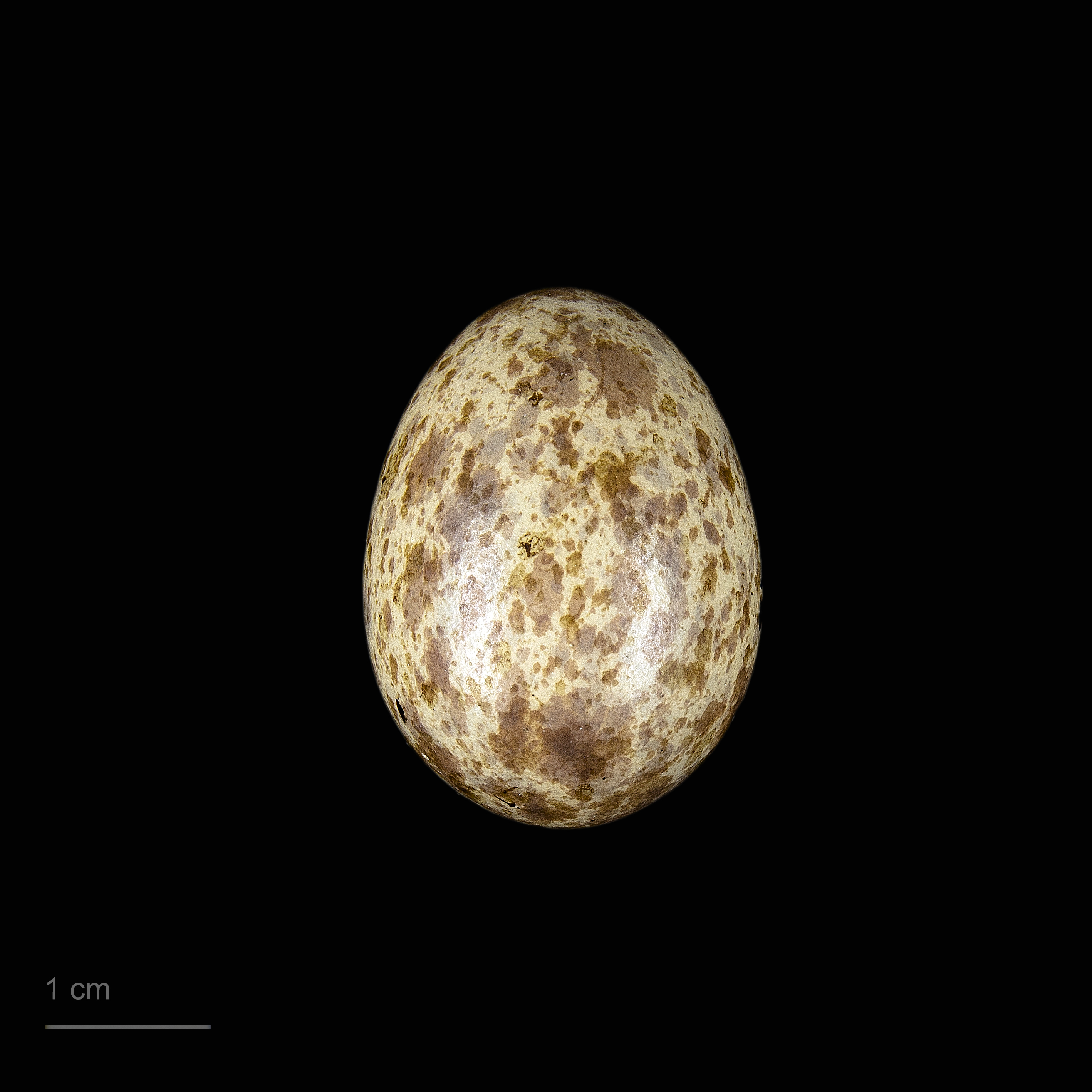
Crypsirina cucullata - (MHNT)

The hooded treepie (Crypsirina cucullata) is a species of bird in the family Corvidae. It is endemic to Myanmar.

Its natural habitats are subtropical or tropical moist lowland forest and subtropical or tropical dry shrubland. It is threatened by habitat loss.

It has grey plumage apart from black head, tail and flight feathers.
