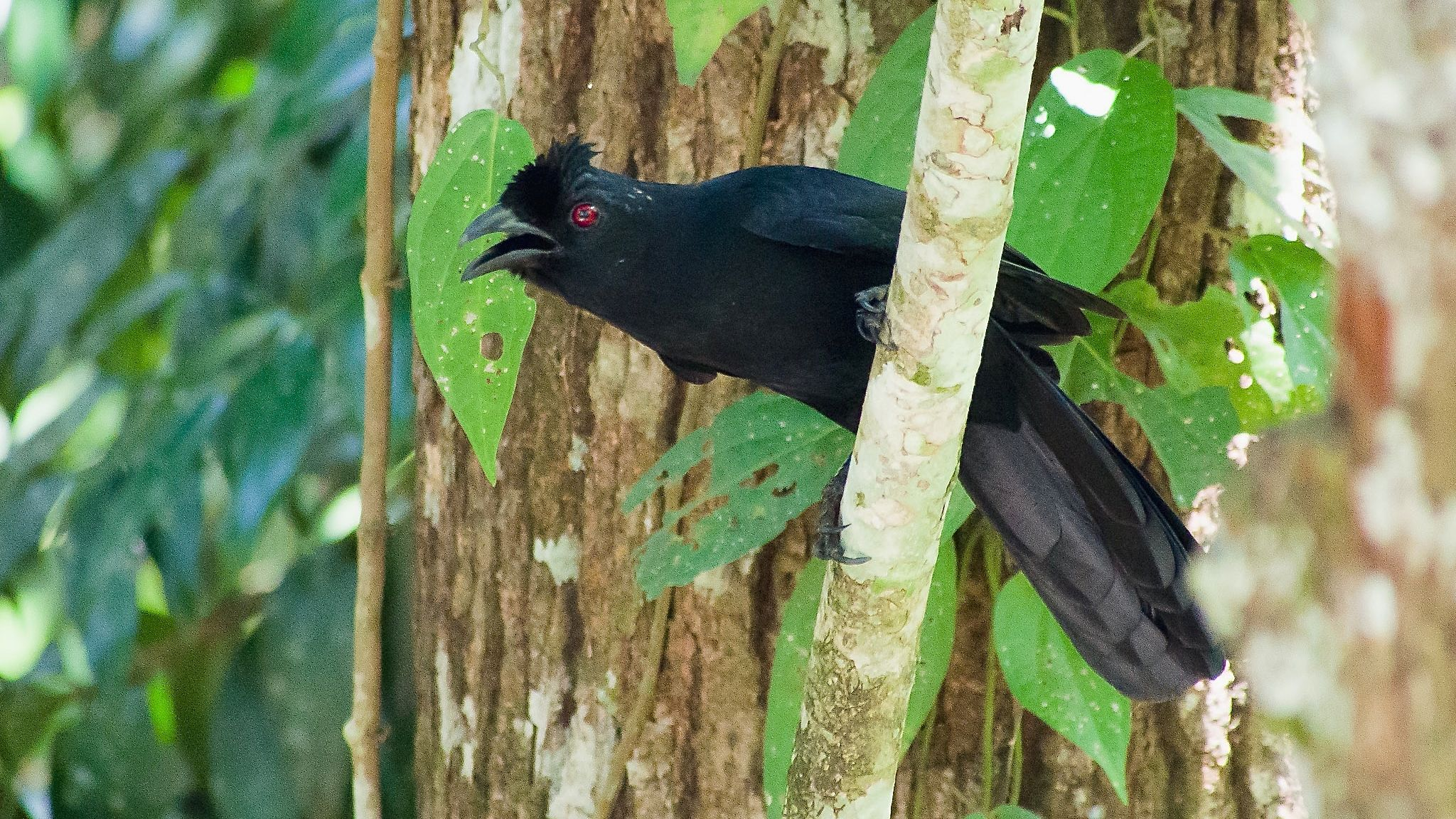

Scientific classification
- Domain: Eukaryota
- Kingdom: Animalia
- Phylum: Chordata
- Class: Aves
- Order: Passeriformes
- Family: Corvidae
- Genus: Platysmurus
- Species: P. aterrimus

Binomial name
- Platysmurus aterrimus (Lesson, 1831)

Synonyms
- Platysmurus leucopterus aterrimus

= Bornean black magpie =

Species of bird

The Bornean black magpie (Platysmurus aterrimus), also known as the black crested magpie, is a treepie in the family Corvidae. It is endemic to the Southeast Asian island of Borneo.

== Taxonomy ==
The Bornean black magpie was formerly considered a distinctive subspecies of the black magpie, but more recent revisions now consider it a full species, Platysmurus aterrimus.

== Description ==
The magpie is about 43 cm in length. It has all-black plumage with a long, broad and graduated tail, a stout black bill, a tall, bristly crest, black legs and feet, and red irises. It has a taller crest than, and lacks the white wing patch of, the nominate subspecies.

== Behaviour ==
The magpie is a garrulous and sociable bird, often seen in family parties. It has a variety of whistling and chattering calls and is also a vocal mimic. It flies with shallow wing beats that produce a distinctive low throbbing whoo or boobooboo sound.

=== Breeding ===
A nest found in the Tabin Wildlife Reserve in September 1981 was described as being about 20 cm across, built of sticks and sited 8 m up in a small tree.

=== Feeding ===
The magpie is an arboreal, foliage-gleaning, insectivore and frugivore, also opportunistically taking small mammals and reptiles.

== Distribution and habitat ==
The magpie is found in the lowlands of Borneo, ranging in altitude up to about 300 m above sea level. It inhabits primary forest, including dipterocarp, kerangas and peat swamp forest, and is also found in secondary forest, overgrown tree plantations and scrub.
