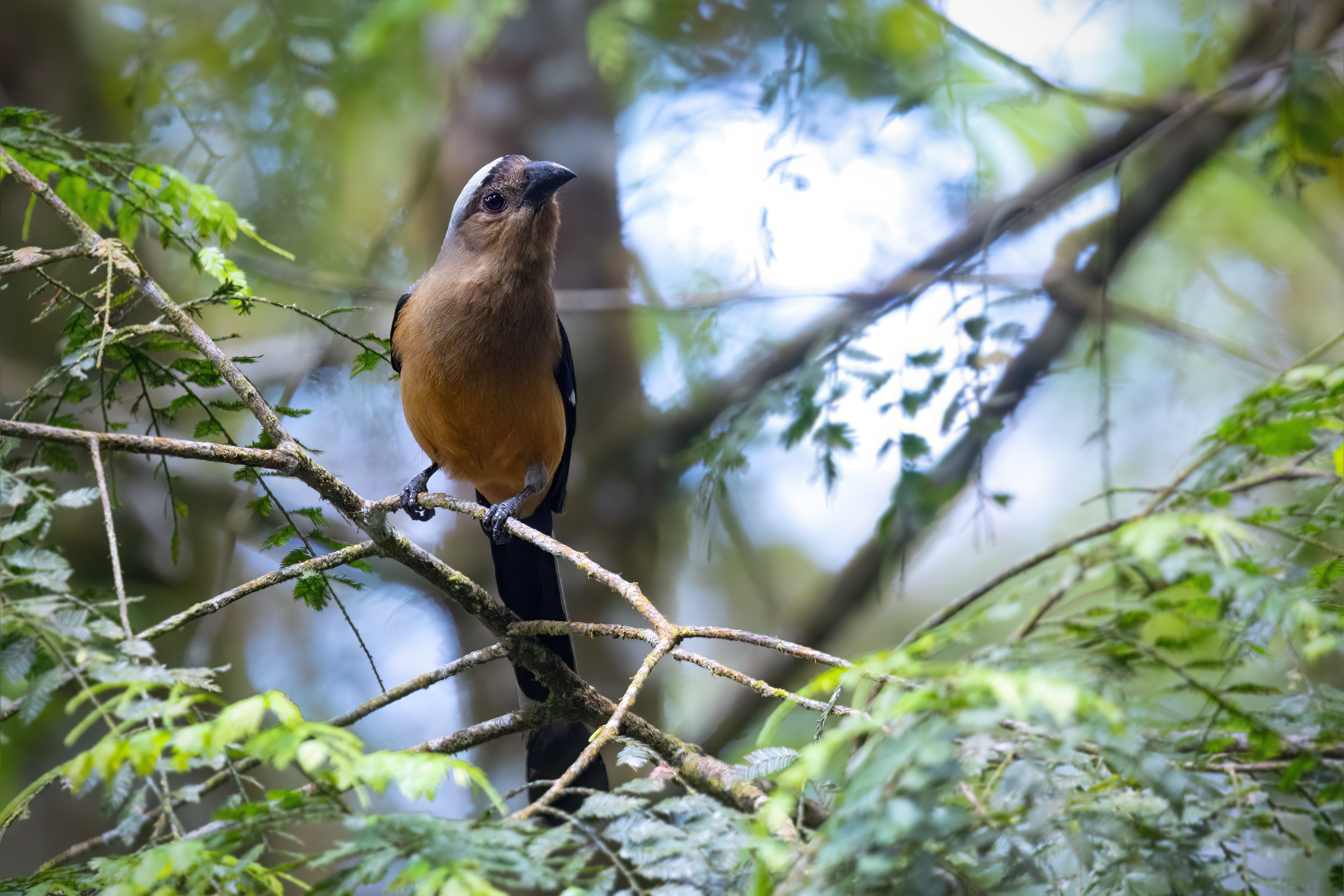
- On Mount Kinabalu

Conservation status
- Least Concern (IUCN 3.1)

Scientific classification
- Kingdom: Animalia
- Phylum: Chordata
- Class: Aves
- Order: Passeriformes
- Family: Corvidae
- Genus: Dendrocitta
- Species: D. cinerascens

Binomial name
- Dendrocitta cinerascens Sharpe, 1879

Synonyms
- Dendrocitta occipitalis cinerascens

= Bornean treepie =

Species of bird

The Bornean treepie (Dendrocitta cinerascens) is a passerine bird belonging to the treepies genus, Dendrocitta, of in the crow family, Corvidae. It is endemic to the island of Borneo. It is sometimes treated as a subspecies of the Sumatran treepie (D. occipitalis).

== Description ==
It is a fairly large bird, 40 centimetres in length, including a long graduated tail, broad rounded wings and short weak legs. The underparts are pinkish-brown. The head is also pinkish-brown with a pale silver crown and a dark stripe over the eye and across the forehead. The back is greyish and the rump is pale. The wings are black with a white patch and the tail is grey with black tips to the feathers. The bill and legs are grey-black and the eyes are reddish. The Sumatran treepie differs in having a pale brown back, a dark brown head with a white nape and a thinner bill.

The Bornean treepie is a noisy bird with a variety of loud, explosive calls including a bell-like whistle and various grunting and chattering calls. It is able to mimic the calls of other birds.

== Ecology ==
It is fairly common in most mountain ranges in the northern and central parts of Borneo. It mainly occurs between 300 and 2,800 metres above sea-level, being most common in valleys and foothills at the lower end of that range. It inhabits forest, forest edge, bamboo thickets and scrubland and is sometimes seen in cultivated areas. It forages in the tree canopy, alone or in small groups, searching for small fruit, seeds and large insects such as beetles and cockroaches. It can become tame, visiting villages to feed on scraps.

Little is known about its breeding habits. The nest is shallow, built of fine twigs and placed in a low tree. The eggs are greenish-white with brown markings concentrated in a ring at the wider end.
