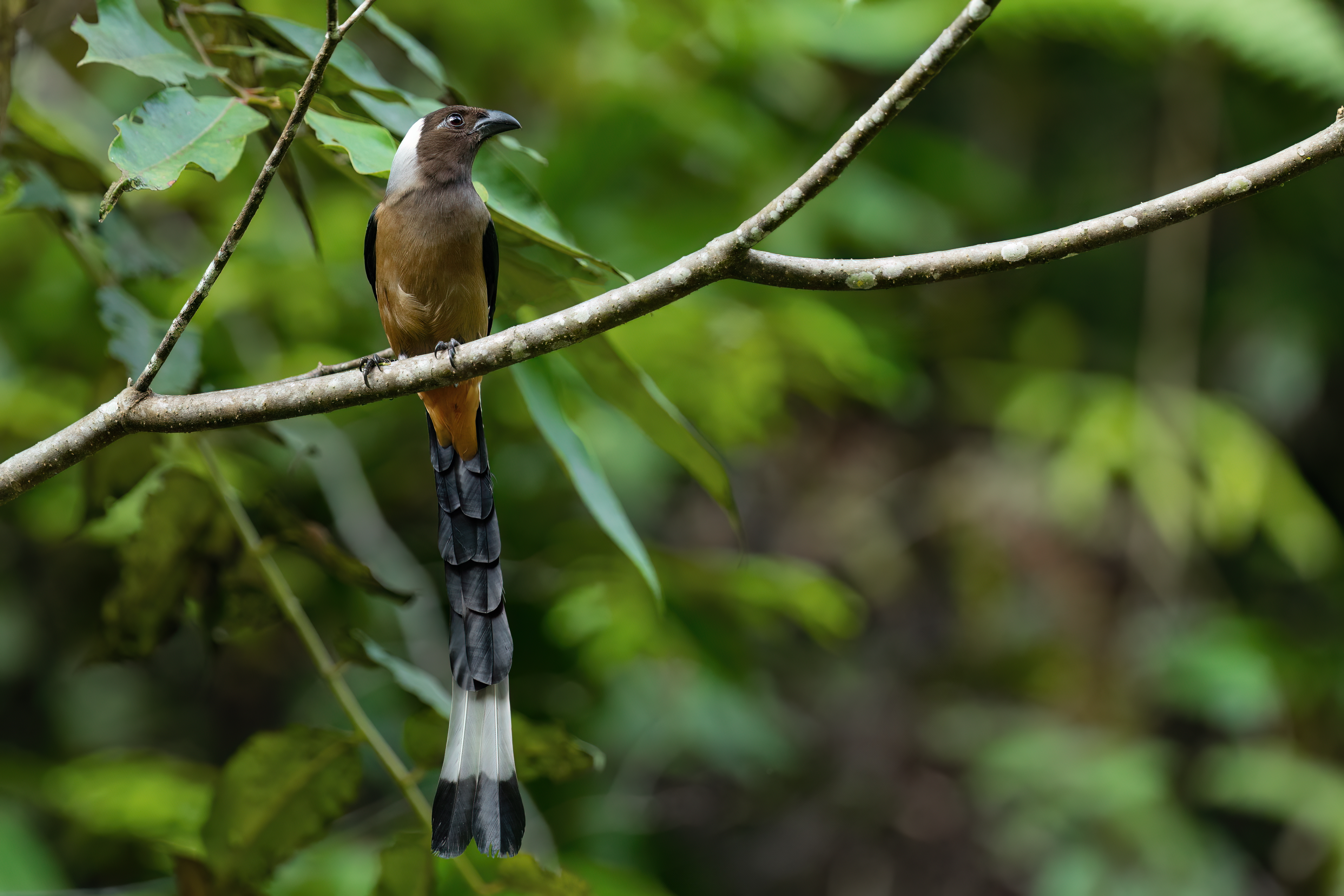
- Illustration by John Gerrard Keulemans in 1877

Conservation status
- Least Concern (IUCN 3.1)

Scientific classification
- Kingdom: Animalia
- Phylum: Chordata
- Class: Aves
- Order: Passeriformes
- Family: Corvidae
- Genus: Dendrocitta
- Species: D. occipitalis

Binomial name
- Dendrocitta occipitalis (Müller, S, 1836)

= Sumatran treepie =

Species of bird

The Sumatran treepie or Sunda treepie (Dendrocitta occipitalis) is a species of bird in the family Corvidae. It is endemic to the island of Sumatra in Indonesia. Its natural habitats are subtropical or tropical moist lowland forest and subtropical or tropical moist montane forest. The Bornean treepie (D. cinerascens) is sometimes considered to be a subspecies of this bird.
