= Seaview =

Seaview or Sea View may refer to:

== Places ==
- Clifton Beach, Karachi, also known as Sea View, a beach in Pakistan
- Sea View, Dorset, a suburb in England
- Seaview, Isle of Wight, a small village in England
- Seaview, Lower Hutt, an industrial suburb of Lower Hutt, New Zealand
- Seaview, New Brunswick, a small Canadian coastal community
- Seaview, Eastern Cape, South Africa
- Seaview, Hawaii, United States
- Seaview, Virginia, United States
- Seaview, Washington, United States
- Seaview, Seattle, Washington, United States
- Seaview, Bastardstown, County Wexford, Ireland

== Television and film ==
- USOS Seaview or S.S.R.N. Seaview, the fictitious submarine from Voyage to the Bottom of the Sea (USOS in the film, S.S.R.N. in the television series)
- Seaview (TV series), a British children's TV series from the 1980s
- Seaview (film), a 2008 Irish documentary film

== Other uses ==
- The Catlin Seaview Survey
- Seaview (football ground), football stadium in north Belfast, Northern Ireland, home of Crusaders F.C.
- Seaview (Galloway, New Jersey), a golf club in Absecon, New Jersey, United States
- Seaview (novel), by Toby Olson
- Seaview SVII, an underwater camera
- Seaview Asylum, in Hokitika, New Zealand
- Seaview Hospital, in Staten Island, New York, United States
- Seaview Terrace, a mansion in Newport, Rhode Island, United States
- Sea View Yacht Club, Isle of Wight, England
