= Dive Xtras =

US manufacturer of diver propulsion vehicles

Dive Xtras is a manufacturer of diver propulsion vehicles (DPVs) or dive scooters in Mukilteo, Washington, United States.

== History ==
Established in 2003 by Ben McGeever and Andrew Georgitsis, Dive Xtras introduced their first DPV in 2005. This DPV was innovative in that it was the first to utilize a brushless motor and electronic speed control. The combination of these features with NiMh battery technology drastically reduced the weight of DPVs at the time.

In 2017, Dive Xtras introduced the use of Li-ion power tool batteries (PTBs) for their Piranha line, which became standard for their later BlackTip and CudaX scooters.

== Models ==
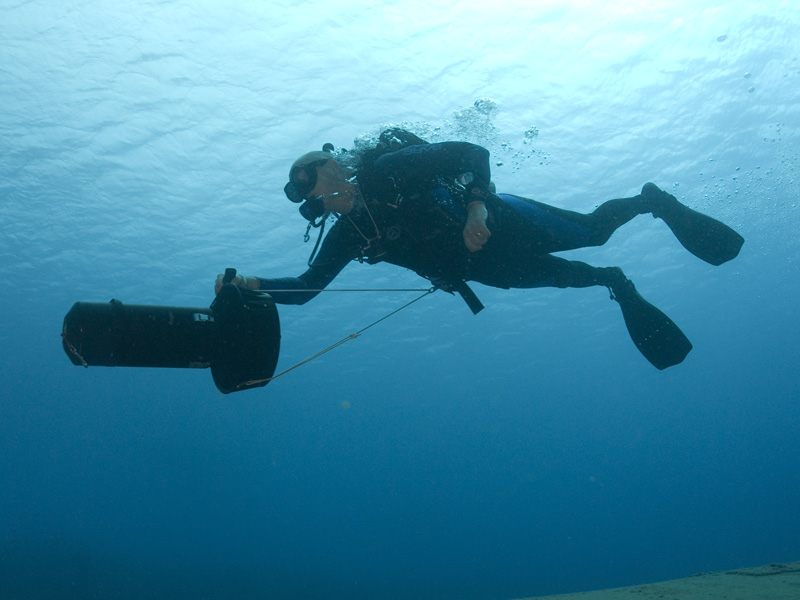
A scuba diver being towed by a Dive Xtras Sierra Scooter

- Sierra Std - The Sierra standard body X-Scooter is the lightest scooter in the Dive Xtras family.
- CUDA 400 - NiMh version of the CUDA Fury 1150 (aka mini CUDA).
- CUDA 550 - The first "CUDA". Slightly shorter than the 650. Used a 550 watt hour battery pack.
- CUDA 650 - The CUDA 650 is the front runner of the CUDA models. At 53 lbs, it is a lightweight compared to more traditional lead acid scooters, yet packs the performance of a heavyweight.
- Cuda 850 - Second production CUDA model. Longer than the 650.
- CUDA Fury 1150 - This X-Scooter sets new standards for performance. Only 5 lbs/2 kg heavier than a Sierra, but with the performance of almost two CUDA 650s.
- Piranha - Next generation of DPVs. Completely modular scooter giving the diver the ability to choose 1, 2, or 3 batteries and easily swap them out at a moment's notice. It has the best power to weight ratio on the DPV market at 25lb-2.5hrs (P1), 34lb-5hrs (P2), & 43lb-7.5hrs (P3).
- BlackTip - Travel, Tech, and Exploration models - powered with standard power tool batteries.
- CudaX - Tech and Exploration models - Dive Xtras' newest model of DPV. Featuring a more powerful motor, 1,000 foot depth rating, separately sealed scooter compartments, and many more new features - all powered by standard power tool batteries.

== Accessories ==
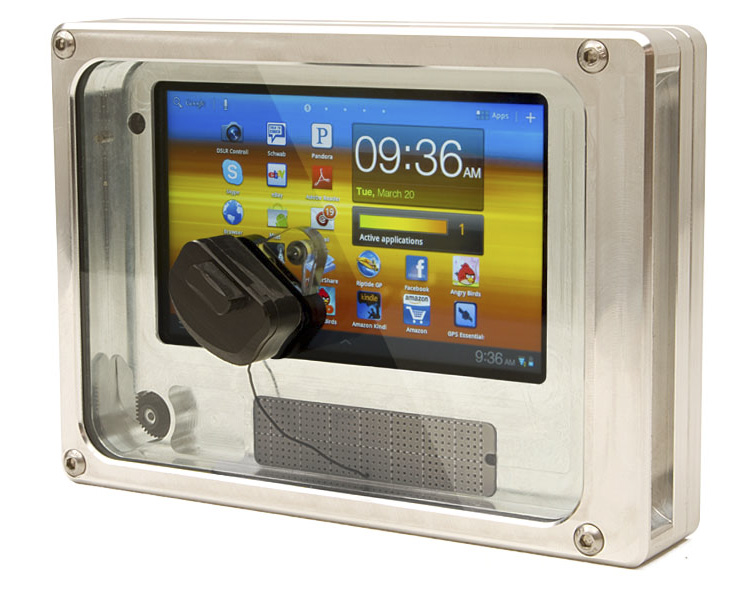
A depth-rated underwater touch housing for a Samsung Galaxy Tab

On December 15, 2011, Dive Xtras filed a patent for a "Device for Operating Touch Screen Devices in a Protective Housing." On March 20, 2012, Dive Xtras announced on their website a depth rated underwater housing for a Samsung Galaxy Tab 7 Plus. The housing gives the user full operation of the tablet underwater by using a mouse-like device to interact with a touch screen.

== Military use ==
Dive Xtras DPVs are used by various military forces around the world to aid in various maritime interdiction tasks. In addition to the units sold into Canada, various South East Asian navies currently use a modified version of the Dive Xtras CUDA. Military products are primarily distributed by Divex Asia Pacific in southeast Asia.

== In the media ==
- Featured in Mission: Impossible III. Ethan Hunt (Tom Cruise) is rescued by Luther (Ving Rhames) when he uses a Sierra X-Scooter to tow himself and gear scuba diving under the Vatican.
- In the book Pulse, by Jeremy Robinson, a Dive Xtras DPV (Sierra CSI) is used.
- Photos of Dive Xtras DPVs often appear in diving publications, as they are frequently used during diving activities noteworthy enough to warrant publication.

== Claroworks and Google Streetview underwater ==
The product development arm of Dive Xtras, Claroworks, designed and built the camera systems used by the Catlin Seaview Survey and Google to map the Galápagos Islands. The camera system, Seaview SVII, shoots 360-degree images, and is mounted on a modified Cuda 650 vehicle. The Seaview SVII also uses Dive Xtras tablet housing for controls.
