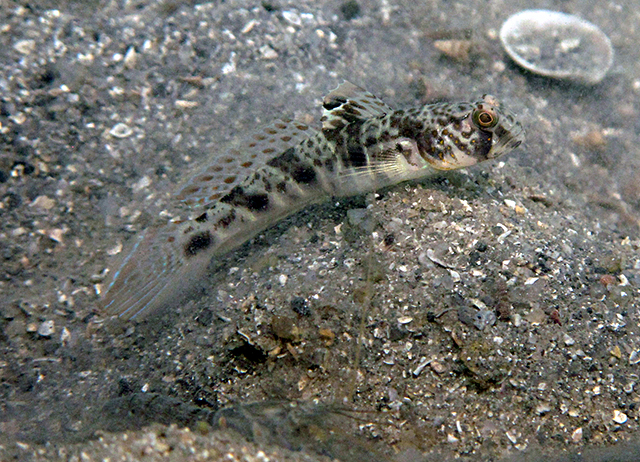

Scientific classification
- Kingdom: Animalia
- Phylum: Chordata
- Class: Actinopterygii
- Order: Gobiiformes
- Family: Gobiidae
- Genus: Tomiyamichthys
- Species: T. russus

Binomial name
- Tomiyamichthys russus (Cantor, 1849)

Synonyms
- Cryptocentrus russus Cantor, 1849; Gobius russus Cantor, 1849; Gobius polyophthalmus Bleeker, 1853

= Tomiyamichthys russus =

Species of fish

Tomiyamichthys russus, the Ocellated shrimpgoby, is a species of marine ray-finned fish belonging to the family Gobiidae, the typical gobies. This species is found in the Eastern Indian Ocean and Western Pacific Ocean.

== Taxonomy ==
Tomiyamichthys russus was first formally described as Gobius russus in 1849 by the Danish zoologist Theodore Cantor with its type locality given as the Penang in Malaysia. The genus Tomiyamichthys belongs to the family Gobiidae which the 5th edition of Fishes of the World places in the order Gobiiformes. Within the Tomiyamichthys this species is the "type species" of the T. russus species group which includes T. gomezi, T. levisquama, T. nudus, T. oni and T. zonatus.

== Etymology ==
Tomiyamichthys russus belongs to the genus Tomiyamichthys, an anem which suffixes ichthys, the Greek for "fish" with the surname of the Japanese ichthyologist Itiro Tomiyama who described the type species of the genus, Cryptocentrus oni in 1936. The specific name, russus, means "red", an allusion to the pinkish colour of this fish's body.

== Description ==
Tomiyamichthys russus has its dorsal fin supported by 6 or 7 spines and 10 soft rays while its anal fin contains a single spine and 10 soft rays. This is a greyish species of shrimp goby which has a dark bar underneath its eye, golden spots, a brown vertical blotch on the operculum and four large brown spots along its flanks which extend onto the lower back. There is also a large spot with pale margins on the posterior margin of the dorsal fin. Its pelvic fins are joined and a frenum is present, The rear part of the body has ctenoid scales, becoming cycloid towards the head but there are no scales on the head. The caudal fin is lanceolate, and is slightly longer than the length of the head. A sensory canal and pores run between the eye and the scapula. This species has a maximum published total length of 12 cm (4.7 in).

== Distribution and habitat ==
Tomiyamichthys russus is a demersal fish found in shallow waters between 0 and 5 m (0 and 16 ft) in depth on silty areas of inshore reefs and sometimes at the mouths of streams. This species is found in the eastern Indian Ocean and Western Pacific Ocean, although in Australia it is restricted to the Low Isles of Queensland.

== Biology ==
Tomiyamichthys russus typically shares a burrow in the sand with an alpheid shrimp.
