= Ove Hoegh-Guldberg (biologist) =

Australian biologist

Ove Hoegh-Guldberg AC FAA
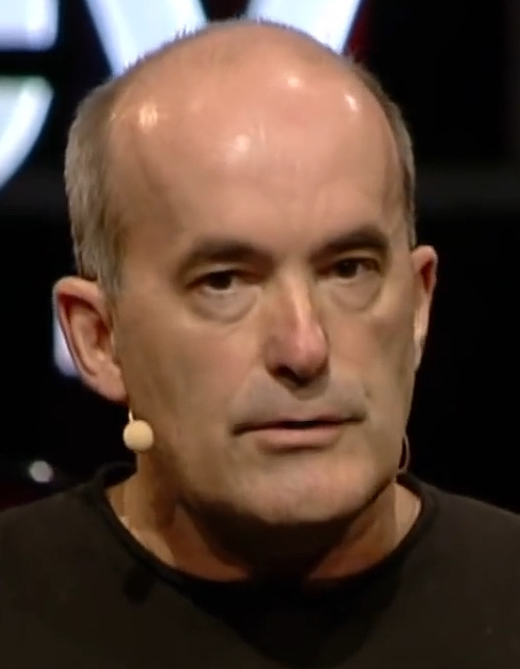
- Ove Hoegh-Guldberg in 2012
- Born: Australia
- Citizenship: Australian
- Education: University of Sydney; UCLA (PhD)
- Known for: Director of Global Change Institute at the University of Queensland; Co-author of the IPCC 8 October 2018 Special Report on Global Warming 1.5°C; Chief Scientist Advisor for Chasing Coral, a Netflix Documentary
- Awards: Australian Laureate Fellowship (2012); Darwin Medal (2026)
- Scientific career
- Fields: marine biology; coral reefs; climate change
- Workplaces: University of Queensland
- Thesis: The effect of sudden changes in temperature, light and salinity on the population density and export of zooxanthellae from the reef corals Stylophora pistillata Esper and Seriatopora hystrix Dana (1989)

Ove Hoegh-Guldberg AC FAA is an Australian biologist and climate scientist specialising in coral reefs, in particular bleaching due to global warming and climate change. He is the inaugural director of the Global Change Institute at the University of Queensland, and the holder of a Queensland Smart State Premier fellowship (2008–2013). He was a major contributor to the influential IPCC 8 October 2018 Special Report on Global Warming of 1.5 °C. Hoegh-Guldberg has appeared on television, including two Australian Story programs profiling his life and work, as well as radio. Throughout his career he has been an active science communicator, including writing a blog and articles for The Conversation and other media outlets.

== Early life and education ==
Ove Hoegh-Guldberg is of Danish and Irish ancestry and is a direct descendant and namesake of Ove Høegh-Guldberg, a politician in late 18th-century Denmark most known for overthrowing and executing radical reformer Johann Friedrich Struensee. His father, the cultural economist Hans Hoegh-Guldberg, was born in Denmark in 1932, and moved to Australia in 1959, where he died in 2016. From an early age Ove wanted to be a scientist, saying "Diver Dan was a great inspiration". He first visited the Great Barrier Reef with his Danish grandfather and grandmother to collect butterflies for a Danish museum.

Hoegh-Guldberg graduated from the University of Sydney with a Bachelor of Science (Hons), and received a scholarship to Oxford University. Before starting he met Leonard Muscatine, a world expert in corals in Los Angeles, and changed his plans, sleeping on the floor of the lab to learn from Muscatine. He completed his PhD at UCLA, with a thesis focusing on the physiology of corals and their zooxanthellae under thermal stress.

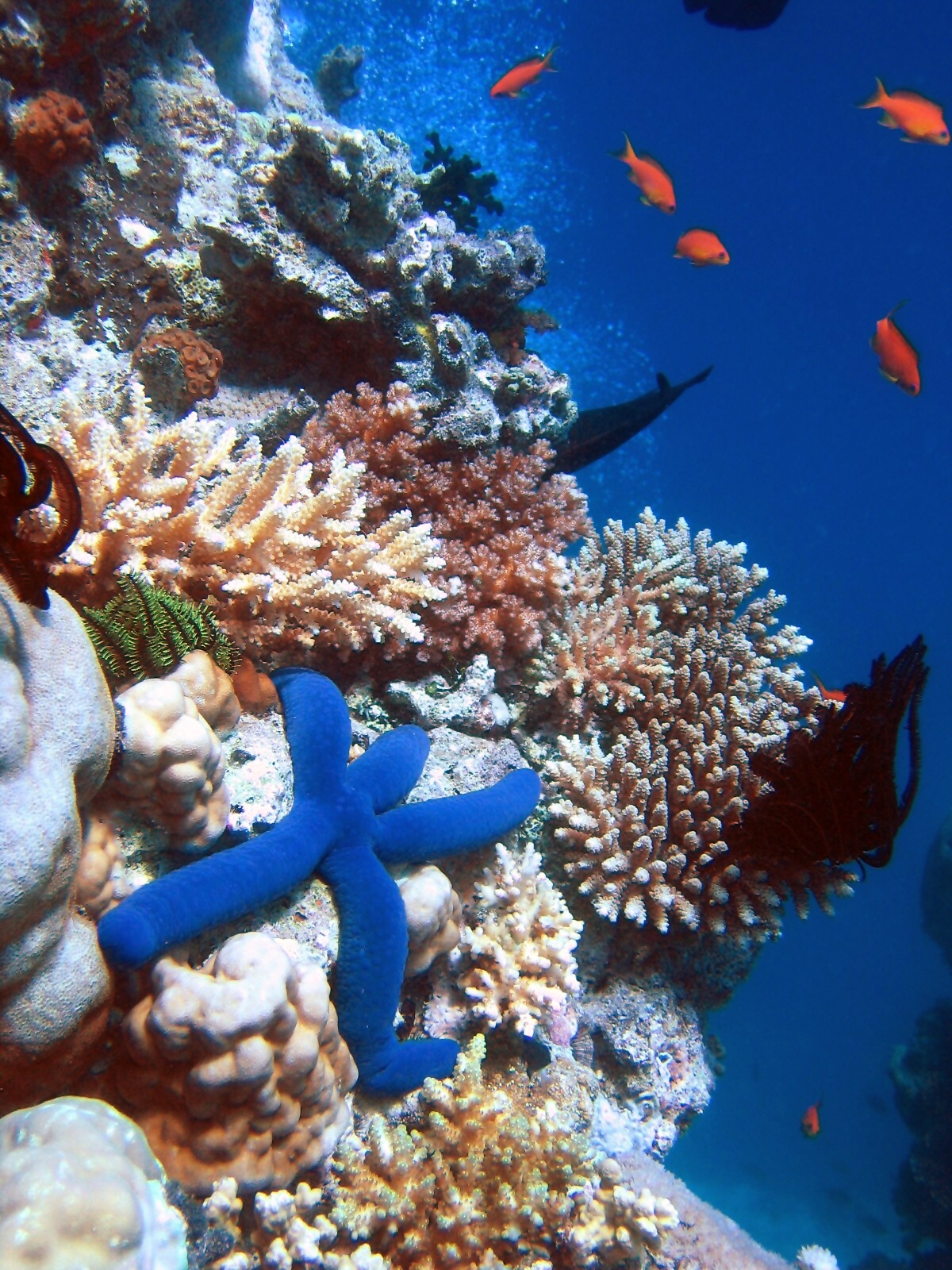
Blue Linckia Starfish at the Great Barrier Reef

== Career ==
In 1999, Hoegh-Guldberg published a paper using data from CSIRO and Germany predicting that most corals across the planet would not survive the next century, and that the Great Barrier Reef would die within 20–30 years. His evaluation was poorly received at the time, with most experts trying to find fault with his long-term predictions, but failing to do so. Since then, however, reefs globally have undergone significant bleaching, the latest studies documenting an 89% decline in new corals in the Great Barrier Reef compared to historical levels.

In 2010, Hoegh-Guldberg was appointed inaugural director of the Global Change Institute, a collaborative research hub aimed to address the impacts of climate change.

In 2017, Hoegh-Guldberg was one of the Chief Scientific Advisors to the Netflix documentary Chasing Coral. Following this, alongside the CEO of The Ocean Agency Richard Vevers, he started the 50 Reefs initiative to identify a number of reefs globally that have the best chance to survive the impacts of climate change and subsequently repopulate neighboring reefs. After releasing a study in March 2018 identifying 50 reefs, Bloomberg Philanthropies invested $86 million in the Vibrant Oceans initiative focused on protecting reefs across the planet.

Hoegh-Guldberg has been an author of various IPCC reports, including being the coordinating lead author of the Oceans Chapter with fifth assessment published in 2014. On 8 October 2018, the Intergovernmental Panel on Climate Change (IPCC) released the Special Report on Global Warming of 1.5 °C, of which one of the findings was that we may have less than 12 years to avoid a temperature rise of over 1.5 °C. Hoegh-Guldberg was a coordinating lead author of the report, and was a coordinating lead author on Chapter 3: Impacts of 1.5 °C of Global Warming on Natural and Human Systems. In an interview with UQ News, he said "A key finding of the report is that 1.5°C is not a safe level of global warming; however it is much safer than 2.0 °C", and that "We are still going to see many challenges at 1.5°C". The IPCC report has been used as justification for climate action movements, including by Greta Thunberg.

As of July 2019, he was a professor of marine studies at the University of Queensland, and was an author in 521 journal articles, which had been cited 54,532 times

== In the media ==
Ove Hoegh-Guldberg has been featured in the media throughout his career, including two segments on Australian Story, "The Heat Of The Moment" (2009) and "Into Hot Water" (2017), and an interview on NPR's All Things Considered. He maintained a blog called Climate Shifts from 2007 to 2014 and has written articles for not-for-profit media outlet The Conversation.

Hoegh-Guldberg has received opposition from some climate deniers in the media, notably conservative columnist Andrew Bolt at the Herald Sun. Bolt has published a number of columns critical of Hoegh-Guldberg's predictions. Hoegh-Guldberg wrote an article in response in 2011 countering Bolt's claims, saying that Bolt had made fundamental scientific errors and had deliberately ignored evidence. He also wrote in another blog post "These mistakes can either be attributed to political partisanship or poor journalism."

In March 2019, Hoegh-Guldberg was named one of the world's top 100 most influential people in climate policy by Apolitical, joining natural historian David Attenborough, Greta Thunberg, and former US vice-president Al Gore.

== Personal life ==
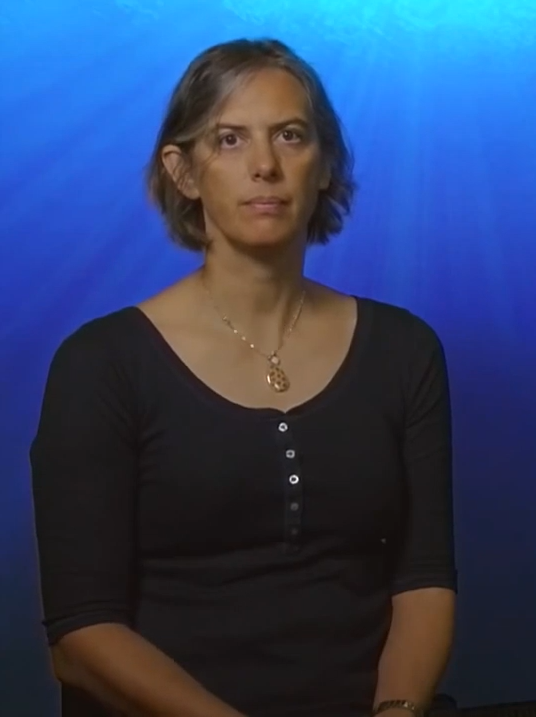
Sophie Dove in 2014

Ove Hoegh-Guldberg married Sophie Dove. Dove was, as of 2025, an honorary associate professor at the University of Queensland, also specialising in coral reefs and the impacts of climate change.

Hoegh-Guldberg has worked with David Attenborough, who praised his work.

== Positions ==
- Professor of Marine Studies, University of Queensland
- Director, Global Change Institute, University of Queensland
- Past director, Centre for Marine Studies, University of Queensland
- Past director, Heron Island, Low Isles, and Moreton Bay research stations
- Director, Stanford Australia Program
- Deputy director, ARC Centre of Excellence for Reef Studies
- Visiting Professor, Stanford University

== Awards ==
- UCLA Distinguished Scholar Award (1988)
- Robert D. Lasiewski Award, UCLA (1989)
- Sydney University Award for Excellence in Teaching (1996)
- The Eureka Prize for Scientific Research (1999)
- Wesley College (University of Sydney) Medal (2009)
- Queensland 2008 Smart State Premier's Fellow (2008–2013)
- Australian Laureate Fellowship (2012)
- Fellow of the Australian Academy of Science (2013)
- Banksia International Award (2016)
- Companion of the Order of Australia (2025)
- Darwin Medal, International Coral Reef Society (2026)
