= The Ocean Agency =

US-based non-profit organization

- Founder: Richard Vevers
- Type: Environmental NGO
- Purpose: Ocean conservation, communication and media, technology, environmentalism
- Location: Newport, Rhode Island
- Founder and CEO: Richard Vevers
- Website: www.theoceanagency.org

The Ocean Agency is an international nonprofit organization dedicated to marine conservation. Currently, The Ocean Agency is focused on coral reef conservation.

== Projects ==
In 2012, The Ocean Agency launched the XL Catlin Seaview Survey to create an underwater Google Street View using the Seaview SVI and Seaview SVII 360-degree underwater cameras. From 2013 to 2016, The Ocean Agency visited more than 26 countries and surveyed over 1,000 km of reef area, taking over a million 360-degree images with the cameras.

In 2014, The Ocean Agency started recording the 3rd Global Coral Bleaching Event, which became the subject of the Netflix Original Documentary Chasing Coral. The documentary premiered at the 2017 Sundance Film Festival and was released on Netflix in July 2017.

In 2016, The Ocean Agency ideated 50 Reefs—a global plan to save coral reefs. This initiative was launched in early 2017 with the support of Bloomberg Philanthropies, The Tiffany & Co. Foundation and the Paul G. Allen Family Foundation. Its aim was to bolster conservation action in key geographies identified as being less vulnerable to climate change and having the best chance of repopulating other reefs over time.

The Ocean Agency was appointed to coordinate International Year of the Reef 2018 by the International Coral Reef Initiative, working in collaboration with the United Nations Environment Programme. The Ocean Agency has launched a bank of coral reef imagery, Year of the Reef Image Bank, to supply imagery to media outlets, organizations and citizens who want to help promote the Year of the Reef.
