= Tomiyamichthys elliotensis =

Scientific classification
- Kingdom: Animalia
- Phylum: Chordata
- Class: Actinopterygii
- Order: Gobiiformes
- Family: Gobiidae
- Genus: Tomiyamichthys
- Species: T. elliotensis

Binomial name
- Tomiyamichthys elliotensis G. R. Allen, Erdmann & Dudgeon, 2023

Species of fish

Tomiyamichthys elliotensis, commonly known as the Lady Elliot shrimp goby, is a species of small, symbiotic shrimpgoby from the Great Barrier Reef, specifically Lady Elliot Island in Queensland, Australia. This species was described in 2023 by Gerald R. Allen, Mark V. Erdmann, and Chris L. Dudgeon.

== Etymology ==
The species name "elliotensis" is derived from Lady Elliot Island, the type locality where the species was first discovered.

== Description ==
This species reaches a length of 75.6 cm (29.8 in).

This species has a whitish body with four large ovate brown spots along the midside, five or six diagonal yellow-orange bands on the first dorsal fin, a prominent narrow dark stripe along the middle, and a yellow outer margin on the second dorsal fin. The pelvic fins are bluish with yellow fin rays2. Dorsal spines: 7; Dorsal soft rays: 9; Anal spines: 1; Anal soft rays: 8.

== Habitat ==
=== Distribution ===
Endemic to Lady Elliot Island at the southern end of the Great Barrier Reef.

=== Environment ===
Found at depths of 15–24 meters, inhabiting relatively flat, sandy bottoms exposed to periodic strong tidal currents, this species shares burrows with alpheid snapping shrimps, where the fish act as lookouts to warn the shrimp of predators.

== Behavior ==
In terms of social structure, most individuals are solitary though about 20% of burrows have pairs of shrimpgobies guarding the entrance.

== Feeding ==
The Lady Elliot shrimp goby is omnivorous: feeding on small invertebrates and algae.

== Conservation ==
This species has not been evaluated by the IUCN, nor has it been listed by CITES.
