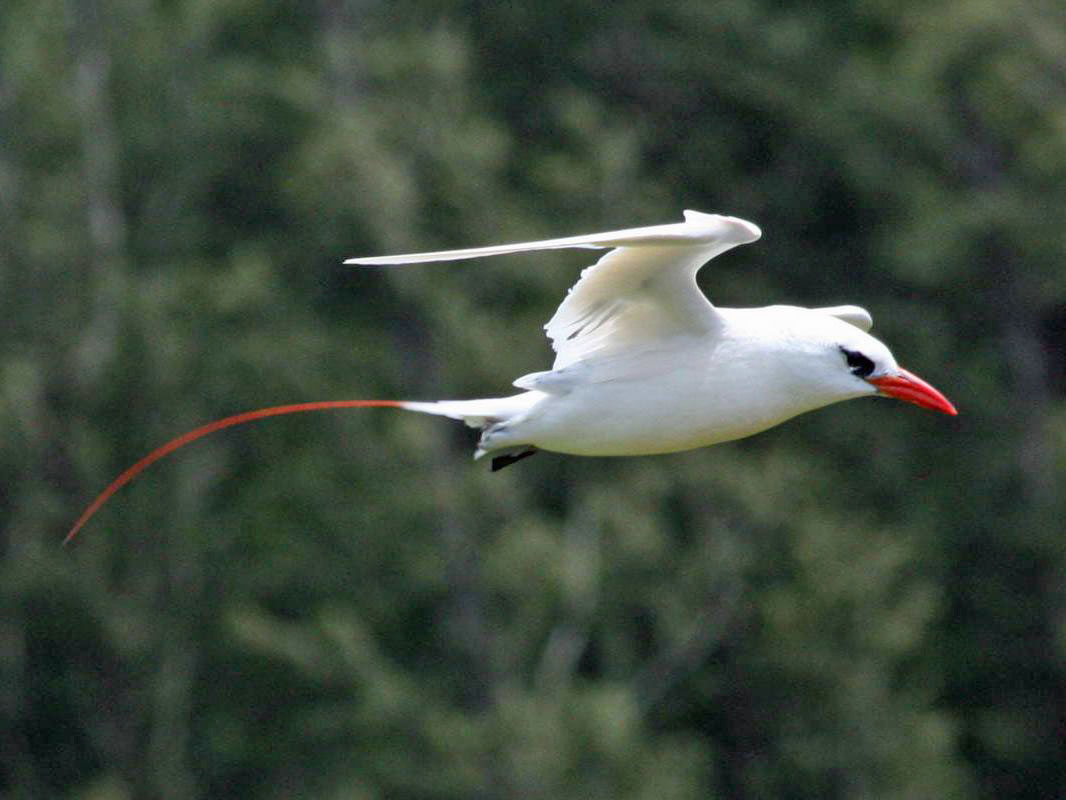
- In flight, Kilauea Point, Kauai, Hawaii

Conservation status
- Least Concern (IUCN 3.1)

Scientific classification
- Kingdom: Animalia
- Phylum: Chordata
- Class: Aves
- Order: Phaethontiformes
- Family: Phaethontidae
- Genus: Phaethon
- Species: P. rubricauda

Binomial name
- Phaethon rubricauda Boddaert, 1783
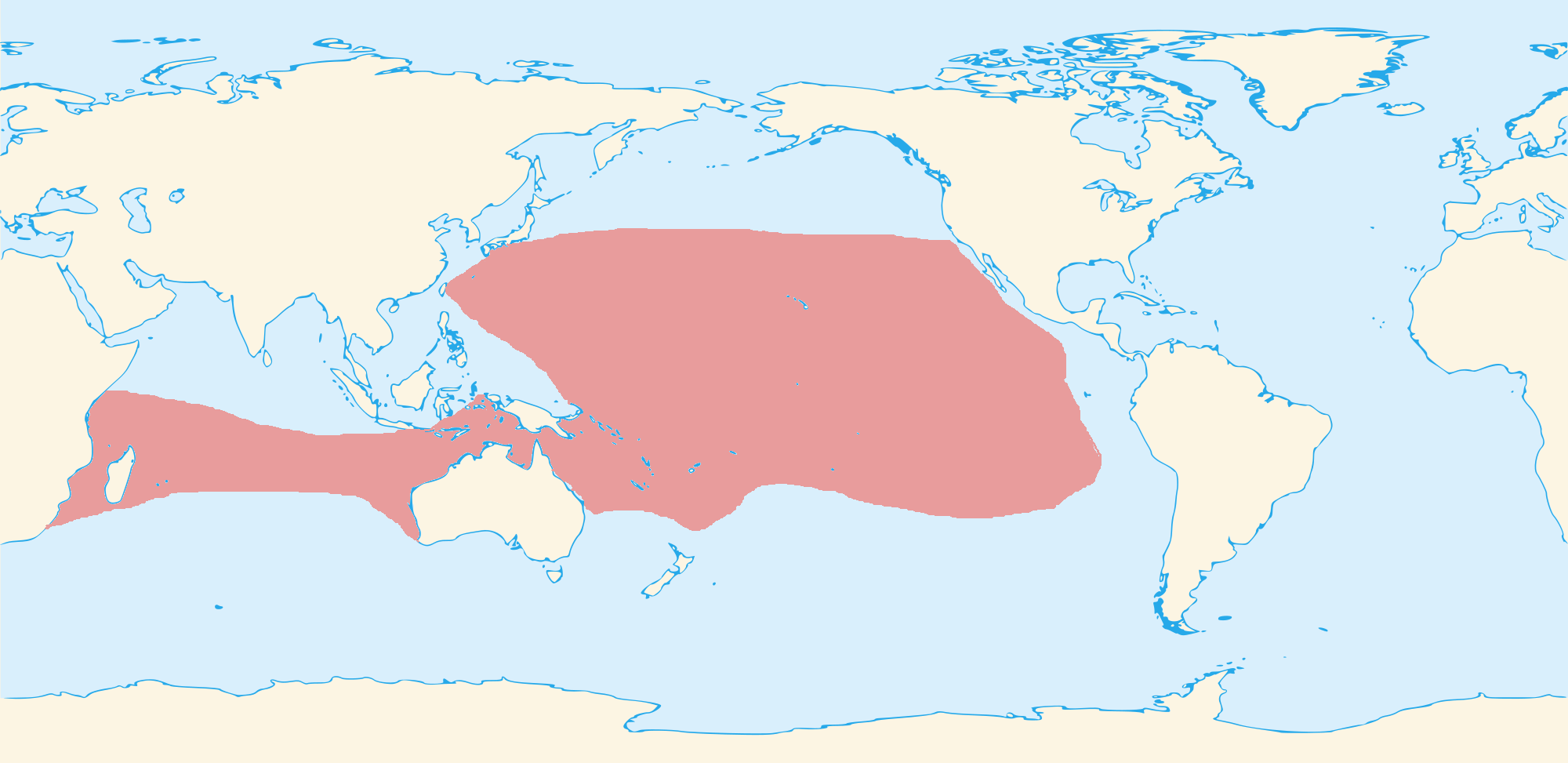
- Range (in pink)

Synonyms
- Phaethon phoenicuros Gmelin 1789; Phaëthon novae-hollandiae Brandt, 1840

= Red-tailed tropicbird =

Seabird of the tropical Indian and Pacific Oceans

The red-tailed tropicbird (Phaethon rubricauda) is a seabird native to tropical parts of the Indian and Pacific Oceans. One of three closely related species of tropicbird (Phaethontidae), it was described by Pieter Boddaert in 1783. Superficially resembling a tern in appearance, it has almost all-white plumage with a black mask and a red bill. The sexes have similar plumage. As referenced in the common name, adults have red tail streamers that are about twice their body length. Four subspecies are recognised, but there is evidence of clinal variation in body size—with smaller birds in the north and larger in the south—and hence no grounds for subspecies.

The red-tailed tropicbird eats fish—mainly flying fish and squid—after catching them by plunge-diving into the ocean. Nesting takes place in loose colonies on oceanic islands; the nest itself is a scrape found on a cliff face, in a crevice, or on a sandy beach. A single egg is laid, then is incubated by both sexes for about six weeks. The parents make long food-foraging trips of about 150 hours during incubation, but once the chick has hatched, the parents specialize their foraging: one forages for the chick for a few hours at a time, while the other makes much longer trips to feed themselves.

This bird is considered to be a least-concern species according to the International Union for Conservation of Nature (IUCN), though it is adversely affected by human contact. Rats and feral cats prey on eggs and young at nesting sites. The bird's tail streamers were once prized by some Hawaiian and Māori peoples.

== Taxonomy ==
The British naturalist Sir Joseph Banks encountered the red-tailed tropicbird on the Pacific Ocean in March 1769 on James Cook's first voyage, noting that it was a different species to the familiar red-billed tropicbird. He gave it the name Phaeton erubescens. It was the French polymath Georges-Louis Leclerc, Comte de Buffon who formally described the species in his Histoire Naturelle des Oiseaux in 1781, noting it was a native of Isle de France (Mauritius). The bird was also illustrated in a hand-coloured plate engraved by François-Nicolas Martinet in the Planches Enluminées D'Histoire Naturelle which was produced under the supervision of Edme-Louis Daubenton to accompany Buffon's text. Buffon did not include a scientific name with his description but in 1783 the Dutch naturalist Pieter Boddaert coined the binomial name Phaethon rubricauda in his catalogue of the Planches Enluminées. The genus name is derived from Ancient Greek phaethon, "sun", while the species epithet comes from the Latin words ruber "red" and cauda "tail". English ornithologist John Latham wrote about the red-tailed tropicbird in 1785 in his General Synopsis of Birds, recording it as common in Mauritius and the South Pacific. He also reported a black-billed tropicbird collected from Palmerston Island that ended up in Banks' collection. Latham did not give them binomial names, however. It was left to German naturalist Johann Friedrich Gmelin to describe the species, which he did as Phaeton phoenicuros and P. melanorhynchos respectively in the 13th edition of Systema Naturae in 1788. Latham later described this black-billed specimen as the New Holland tropicbird, giving it the name Phaethon novae-hollandiae.

The British naturalist Walter Rothschild reviewed the described names and specimens in 1900 and concluded that the original use of P. erubescens was a nomen nudum. He concluded that the populations of Lord Howe, Norfolk and Kermadec Islands belonged to a distinct subspecies which he named P. rubicauda erubescens, due to their larger overall size, more robust bill and prominent reddish tinge to their plumage. He also classified P. melanorhynchus and P. novae-hollandiae as juveniles. The Australian amateur ornithologist Gregory Mathews then applied the name P. rubicauda roseotinctus to Rothschild's P. rubicauda erubescens.

"Red-tailed tropicbird" has been designated the official name by the International Ornithologists' Union (IOC). Other common names include red-tailed bos'nbird or silver bos'nbird, the names derived from the semblance of the tail feathers to a boatswain's marlin spikes, and strawtail. The New Zealand Māori call it amokura, and the native Hawaiians koaʻe ʻula.

Its closest relative is the white-tailed tropicbird (P. lepturus), the split between their ancestors taking place about four million years ago.

Four subspecies are recognised by the IOC:

- P. r. rubricauda Boddaert, 1783 the nominate subspecies, from the western Indian Ocean. Subsequent specimens from the Cocos (Keeling) Islands were allocated to this taxon.
- P. r. westralis Mathews, 1912 from the eastern Indian Ocean. Mathews described it as separate on account of its larger wings. More extensive analysis in 1989 showed that the wing and beak size overlap between this and the nominate subspecies, leaving intensity of colour as the only distinguishing feature.
- P. r. roseotinctus Mathews, 1926 from the southwestern Pacific Ocean, including populations on Kermadec, Lord Howe, Norfolk and Raine Islands.
- P. r. melanorhynchos Gmelin, 1789 from the western, central and southern Pacific Ocean, including populations on the Cook Islands, Tonga, Samoa, the Marquesas and the Society Islands.

The ornithologist Mike Tarburton reviewed the known subspecies in 1989 and concluded that none were valid, noting that there was a clinal change in size in the species: those from Kure Atoll in the North Pacific being the smallest; ranging to those from the Kermadec Islands in the South Pacific being the largest. He also noted that the pink colouration was more intense in new plumage and faded after a few years in museum specimens.

== Description ==
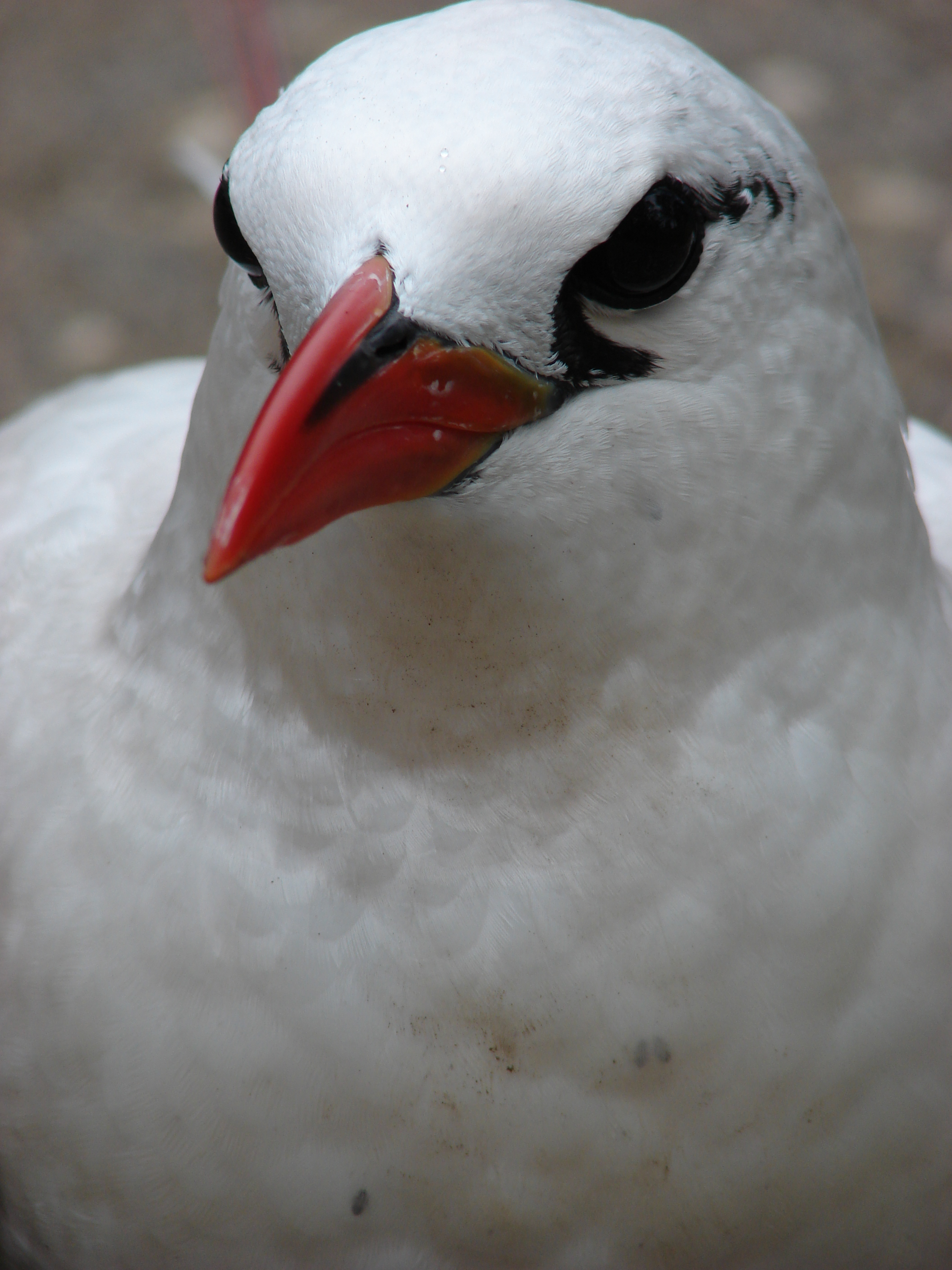
Closeup of head showing comma-shaped markings

The red-tailed tropicbird measures 95 to 104 cm (37 to 41 in) on average, which includes the 35 cm (14 in) tail streamers, and weighs around 800 g (30 oz). It has a wingspan of 111 to 119 cm (44 to 47 in). It has a streamlined but solid build with almost all-white plumage, often with a pink tinge. The sexes are similar in plumage. A dark brown comma-shaped stripe extends back from the lores, through and over the eyes and reaching the ear coverts. The iris is dark brown. The bill is bright red, slightly paler at the base and black around the nostrils. The legs and base of the toes are pale blue-mauve, while the webbing and rest of the toes are black. The white feathers of the head and rump have concealed dark brown bases, while those of the mantle, back, tail rectrices and tail coverts have dark brown shaft bases. The two long tail feathers are orange or red with white bases for around a tenth of their length, and can be hard to see when the bird is flying. The white wings are marked by dark chevron-shaped patches on the tertials, and the dark shafts of the primary flight feathers are visible. The pink tinge is often more pronounced in the remiges of the upper wing. Moulting takes place outside the breeding season, the streamers being replaced before the rest of the feathers. Streamers are replaced at any time, one growing while the other is shed, and old streamers may litter the area around a breeding colony.

Newly hatched chicks are covered in thin, long, grey-white down, which is paler on the head. The lores are bare. The down is greyer in older chicks. The primaries, rectrices and scapulars are evident in the third week, and chicks are mostly feathered with residual down on underparts and under the wings after six weeks, and fully feathered by 11 weeks. Juvenile birds have a glossy white forehead, chin, throat and underparts, and prominent black barring and scaling on their crown, nape, mantle, back, rump and upper wing coverts. Their bills are blackish grey with a light blue-grey base, and grey legs and feet.

In Australian waters the red-tailed tropicbird could be confused with the silver gull (Chroicocephalus novaehollandiae) or various tern species, though it is larger and heavier-set, with a wedge-shaped tail. Its red bill and more wholly white wings distinguish it from the adult white-tailed tropicbird. Immature red-tailed tropicbirds likewise can be distinguished from immature white-tailed tropicbirds by their partly red rather than yellow bills.

The red-tailed tropicbird is generally silent while flying. Aside from during courtship displays, birds may give a short greeting squawk to their mate when arriving or leaving the nest. Birds give a low growling call as a defence call, and young chatter repetitively as a begging call—made whenever the parents are nearby.

== Distribution and habitat ==
The red-tailed tropicbird ranges across the southern Indian, and western and central Pacific Oceans, from the East African coast to Indonesia, the waters around the southern reaches of Japan, across to Chile, and the Hawaiian Islands, where they are more common on the northwestern islands. It frequents areas of ocean with water temperatures from 24 to 30 °C (75 to 86 °F) and salinity under 35% in the southern hemisphere and 33.5% in the northern hemisphere. In the Pacific Ocean, the southern boundary of its range runs along the 22 °C (72 °F) summer surface isotherm.

The birds disperse widely after breeding. Evidence suggests birds in the Indian Ocean follow prevailing winds westwards, young individuals banded in Sumatra and Sugarloaf Rock, Western Australia, being recovered at Mauritius and Réunion respectively. Banding on Kure Atoll suggests birds in the North Pacific disperse in an easterly direction, following prevailing winds there. Strong winds can blow them inland on occasions, which explains some sighting records away from the coast and their preferred habitats.

Johnston Atoll It is the world's largest colony of red-tailed tropicbirds, with 10,800 nests in 2020. In the Pacific area, it nests on the Australian offshore territories of Norfolk and Lord Howe Islands, and on Queensland's coral islands (including Raine Island and Lady Elliot Island). In mid-2020 Australian scientists found a bird on Lady Elliott Island that they had banded 23 years earlier as a chick, but had not seen since, which had come back to breed on the island. In New Zealand territory it breeds on the Kermadec Islands. Elsewhere in the Pacific it breeds in Fiji, New Caledonia, French Polynesia, Hawaii—with a large colony on Kure Atoll—the Cook Islands, Pitcairn Island, and islands off Japan and Chile.

There are large breeding colonies on Europa, Aldabra and Christmas Island in the Indian Ocean, with smaller colonies in Madagascar, where it nests on the tiny island of Nosy Ve, the Seychelles, and Mauritius. It is also found on the Australian territory of Cocos (Keeling) Islands in the Indian Ocean. The warm waters of the Leeuwin Current facilitate the species nesting at Cape Leeuwin in southwestern Australia, yet is only a rare visitor to New South Wales at corresponding latitudes on the Australian east coast. It also nests at Ashmore Reef and Rottnest Island off Western Australia, as well as Sugarloaf Rock at Cape Naturaliste and Busselton on the Western Australian coastline itself.

It is an occasional visitor to Palau, breeding being recorded from the Southwest Islands, and was first recorded from Guam in 1992. It is an uncommon vagrant to New Zealand proper, where it has been recorded from the northern reaches of North Island, especially Three Kings Islands. It is a very rare vagrant to North America, with records from California and Vancouver Island.

== Behaviour ==
The red-tailed tropicbird is a strong flyer, and walks on land with difficulty using a shuffling gait.

They can hover in midair by flying into the wind; pairs may even fly backwards and circle each other during courtship displays.

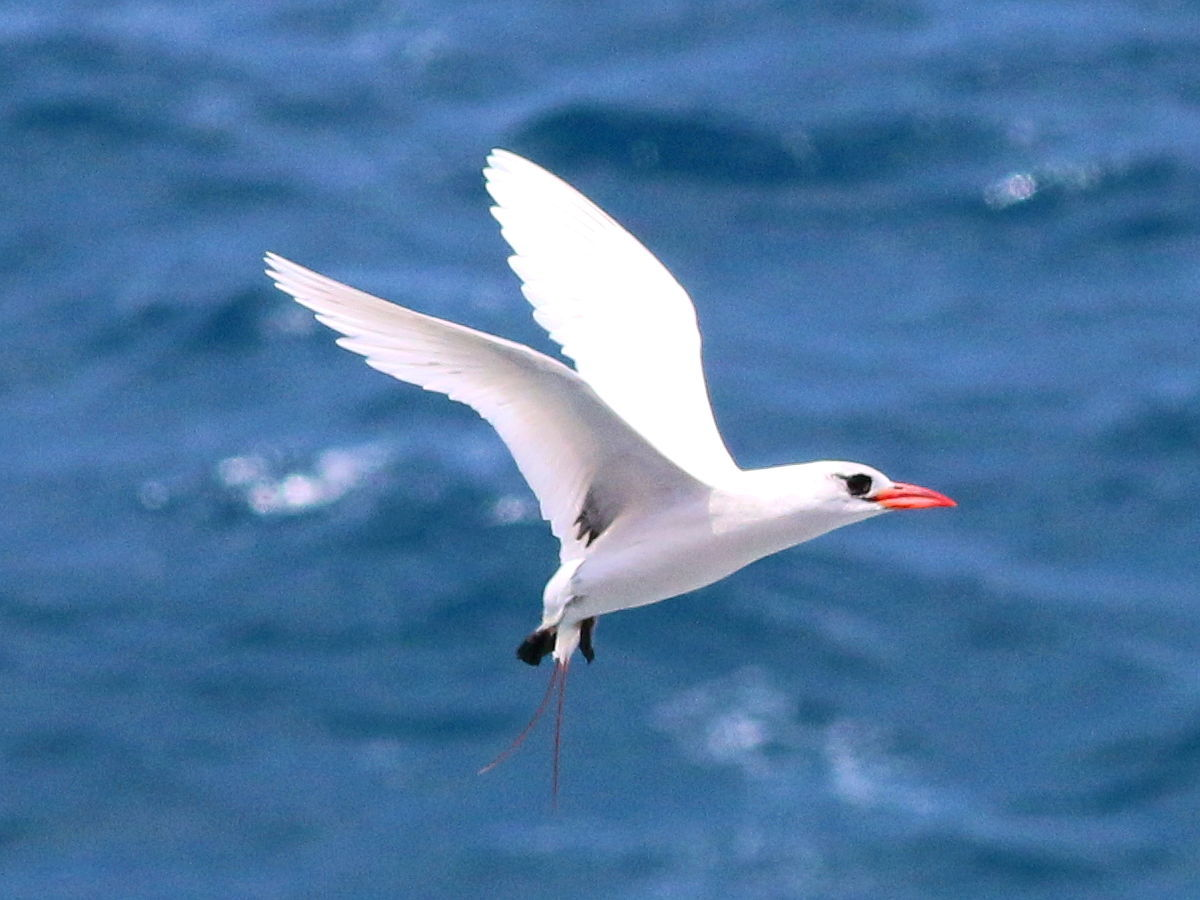
hovering/flying backwards

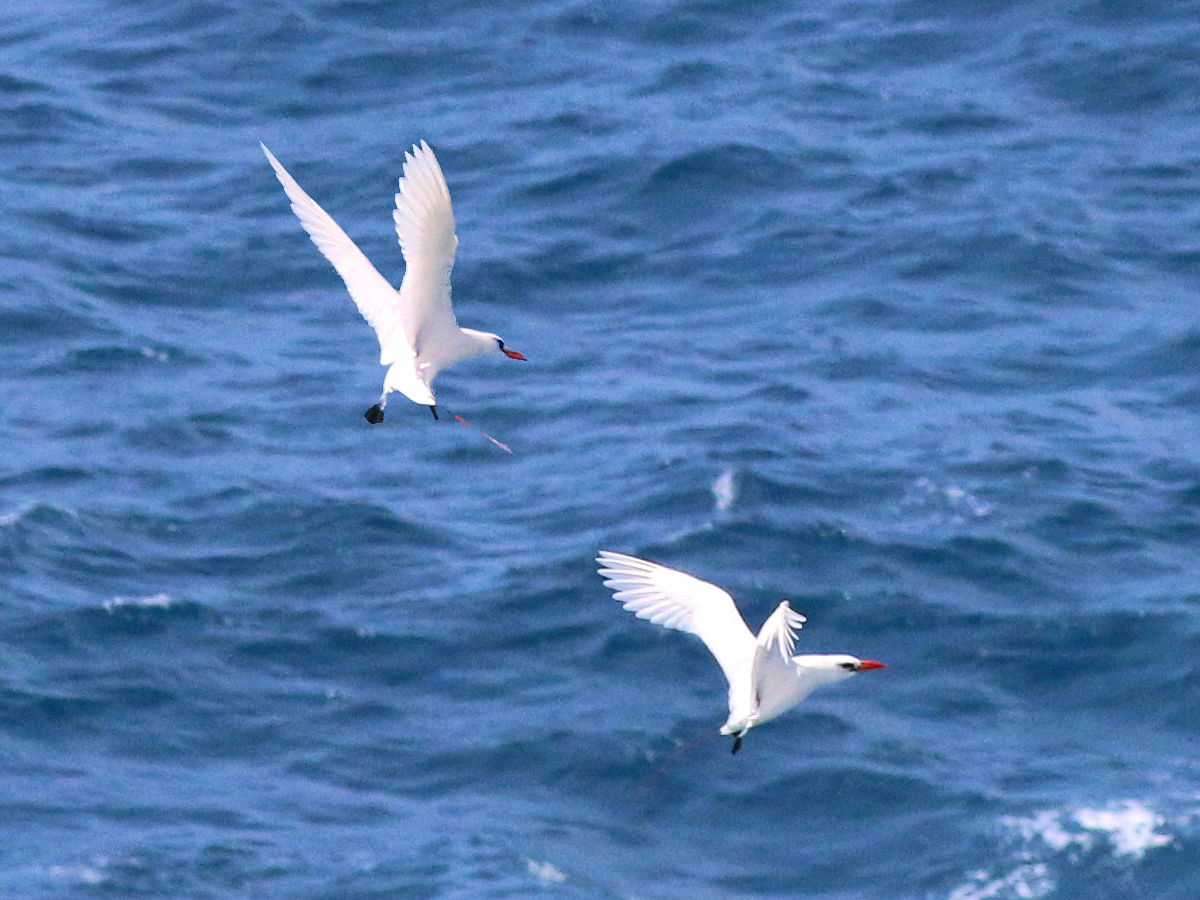
circling courtship

=== Breeding ===
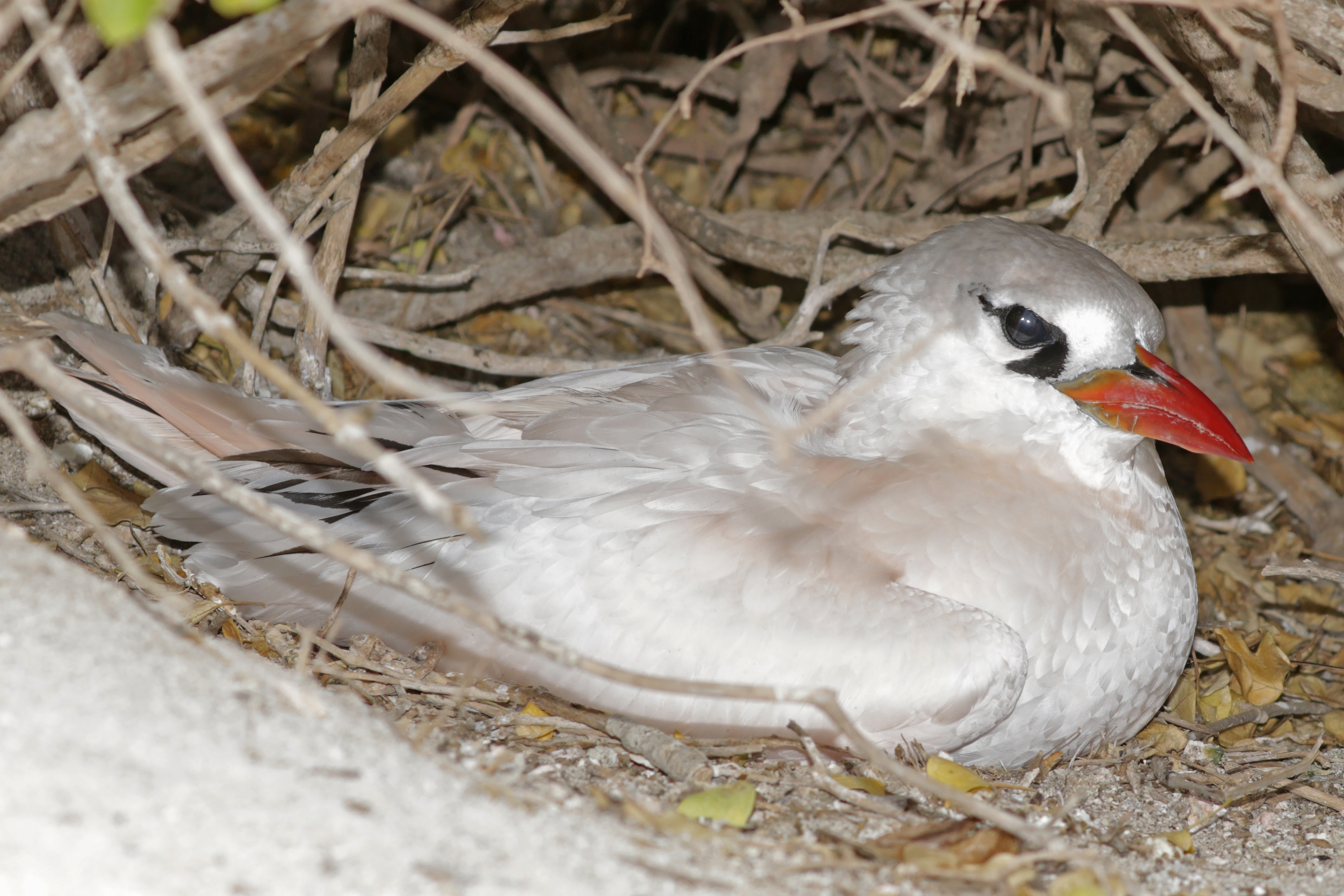
P. r. rubricuada nesting on Nosy Ve

The red-tailed tropicbird is thought to be monogamous, pairs remaining bonded over successive breeding seasons, although such information as age at first breeding and pair-formation is not known. It nests in loose colonies, on offshore islands and stacks, rocky cliffs, coral atolls and cays. It rarely nests on large bodies of land, though has done so in southern Western Australia. The nest itself is a shallow scrape, in either shaded sand or a rocky crevice, or under a shrub. Because the red-tailed tropicbird does not walk well, it lands by flying into the wind, stalling and dropping to the ground. The nest is often located within one metre (3.3 ft) of the edge of the shrub (or other shaded area) to minimise walking distance. The tropicbird often chooses shrubs with fewer stems for accessibility.

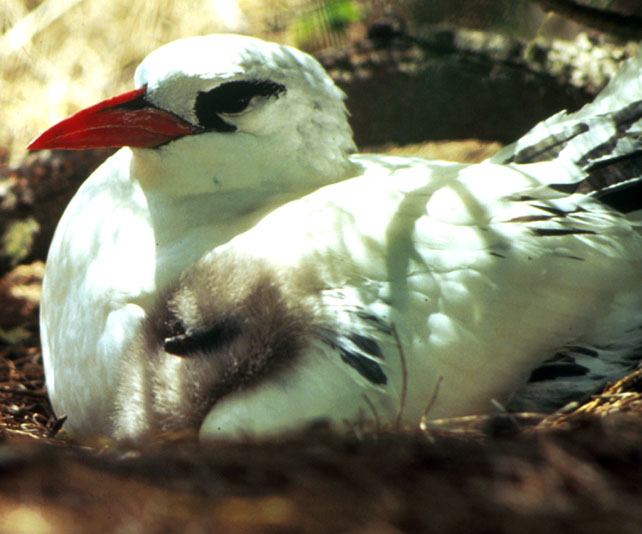
Nesting and sheltering chick under its wing

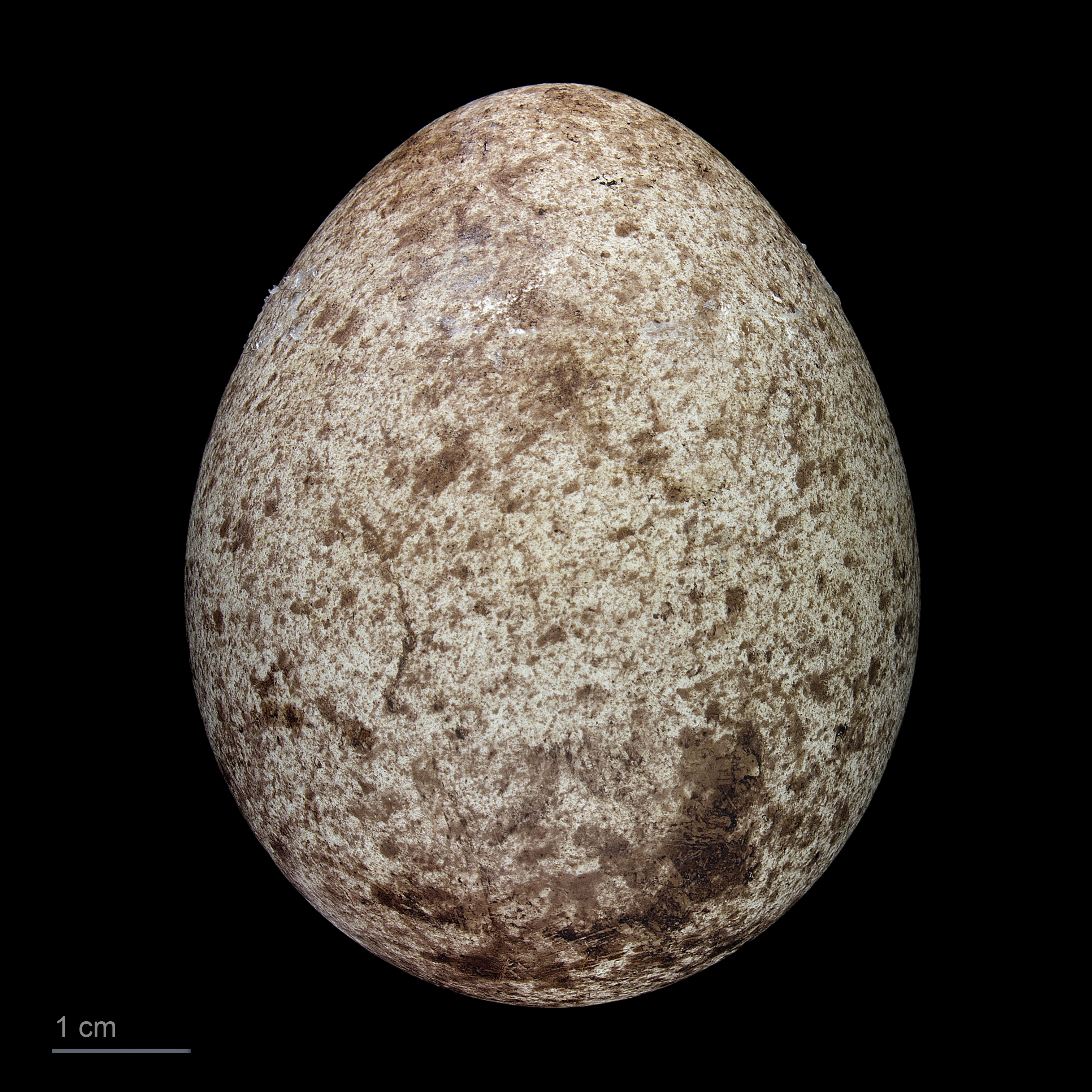
Egg

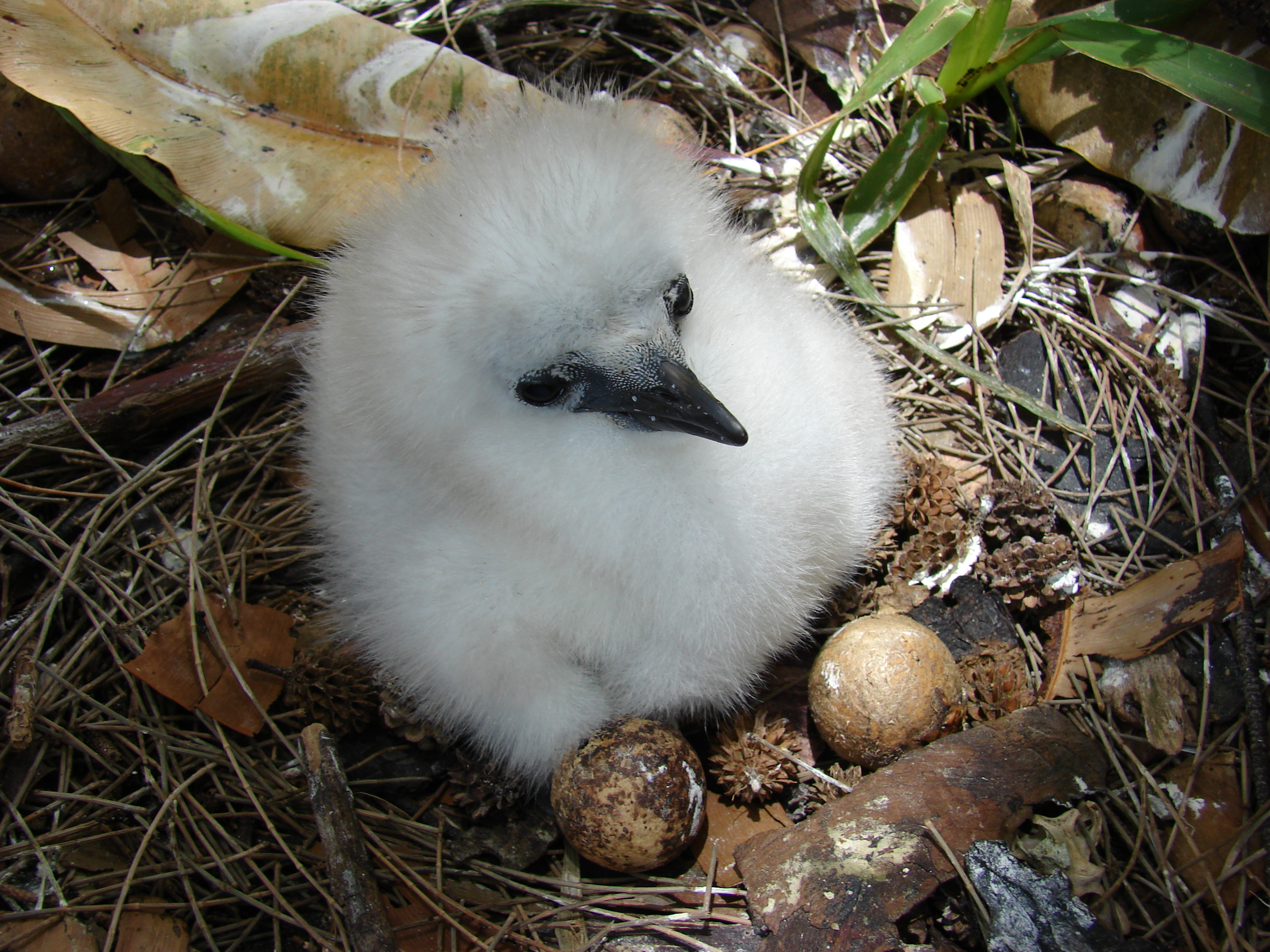
Young chick with down

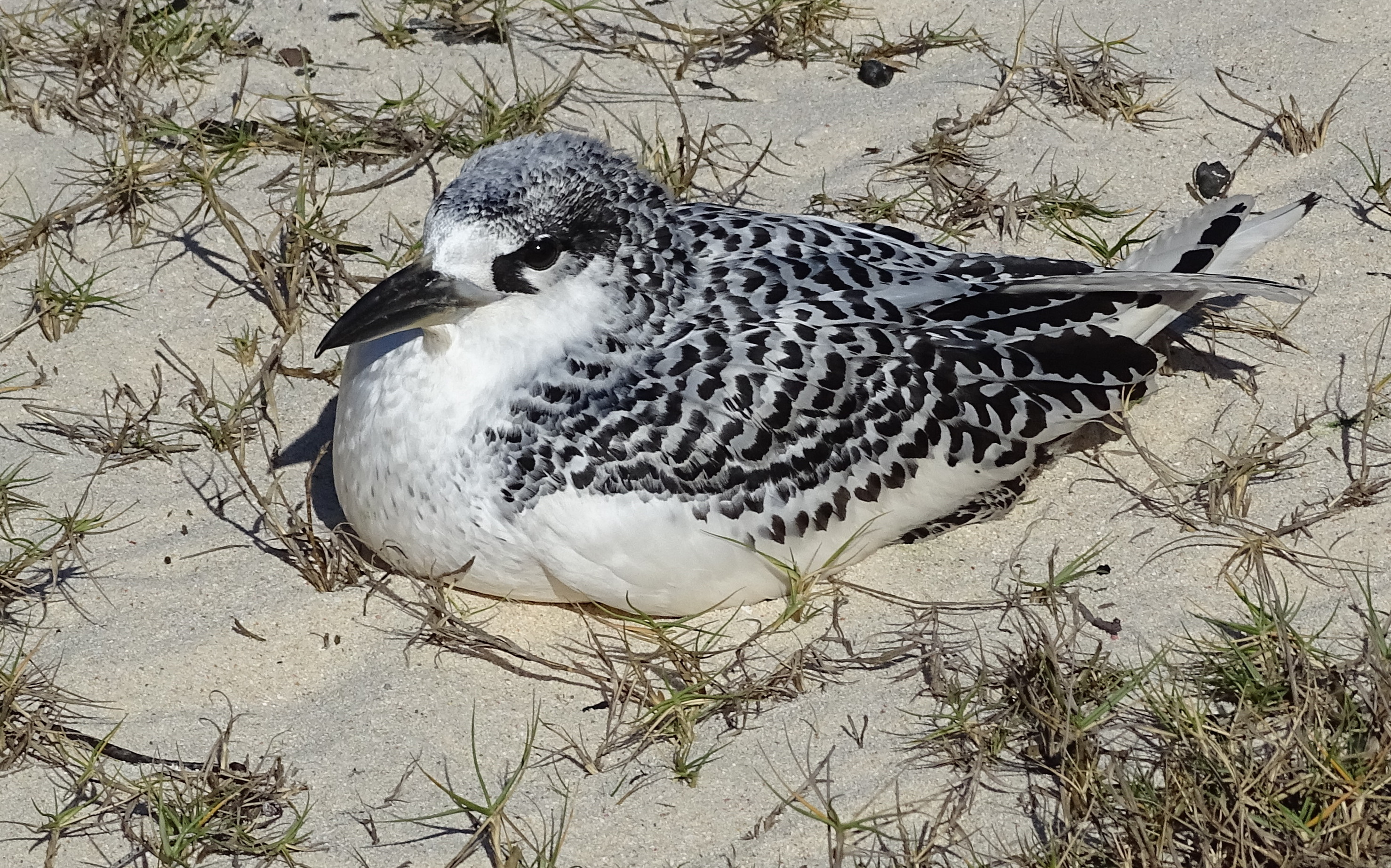
Young bird on Nosy Ve, Madagascar

The species is territorial to a degree, aggressively defending the nest site and pecking radius around it, commencing around three months before breeding. Birds are more aggressive at crowded colonies, where numbers are large or suitable nest sites less common. They adopt a defence posture, which consists of raising the humeri up and bringing the wrists together, drawing the neck into the body and shaking the head sideways, fluffing up the head feathers and squawking. Bill-jabbing and fights can break out, the two combatants locking bills and wrestling for up to 90 minutes.

Mate choice is likely to be based partially on the length of the tail streamers, a bird having longer tail streamers being more attractive as a mate. This tropicbird also probably mates assortatively for tail streamer length, meaning mates likely have streamers of about equal length.

In the leadup to breeding, males initiate an aerial courtship display of flying in large circles, alternating between gliding, short periods of rapid wing-beating, and low flight within a few metres of the water, while making sharp cackling calls. Initially flying in small groups, birds then pair off to repeat the display in pairs before bonding. Once pairs have established a nest, they do not perform the display.

The timing of breeding depends on location; in some places, birds breed in a defined breeding season, whereas in others, there is none. South of the equator, the latter is likely to be true. On islands near the equator, laying usually occurs from June to November, the majority of chicks fledging around January to February. On Christmas Island, breeding takes place at different times on different parts of the island due to prevailing weather conditions. Some birds may remain at the breeding site year-round. On sub-tropical Lady Elliott Island off Queensland, they nest in winter, which scientists think may be timed to avoid the common breeding times of most migratory species of seabird, such as the noisy Wedge-tailed Shearwater (mutton bird). Not much is yet known about their habits though.

The female red-tailed tropicbird lays one egg, which both parents incubate for 42 to 46 days. The male generally takes the first turn on the egg after it is laid. Ranging from 5.4 to 7.7 centimetres (2.1 to 3.0 in) long (averaging between 6.3 and 6.8 centimetres (2.5 and 2.7 in), depending on location) and 4.5 to 4.8 centimetres (1.8 to 1.9 in) wide, the oval eggs are pale tan with brown and red-black markings that are more prominent on the larger end.

Born helpless and unable to move around (nidicolous and semi-altricial), the chicks are initially blind, opening their eyes after 2–3 days. Until they are a week old, they open their beak only upon touch, so the parents have to stroke the base of the bill to initiate feeding. Feeding takes place once or twice a day, generally around midday. They are constantly brooded by the parents until they are a week old, after which time they are sheltered under the parents' wings. They also rise up and gape at any nearby bird for food. Both parents feed the young, by shoving its beak into the chick's gullet and then regurgitating food. Initially covered with grey or white down, they grow their first feathers—scapulars—at 16–20 days. Their feet and beaks grow rapidly, outpacing the rest of their bodies. Chicks remain in the nest for 67 to 91 days until they fledge.

=== Feeding ===
The red-tailed tropicbird is mostly a plunge diver, diving anywhere from an above-water height of 6 to 50 metres (20 to 164 ft), to a depth of about 4.5 metres (15 ft), although this may change seasonally. When diving, it remains briefly submerged—one study on Christmas Island came up with an average time of 26.6 seconds—generally swallowing its prey before surfacing. The red-tailed tropicbird sometimes catches flying fish in the air.

During incubation, foraging trips are relatively long, with an average excursion taking about 153 hours. These trips are to very productive areas. After the chicks hatch, on the other hand, the parents adopt a strategy where one takes long trips (these averaging about 57 hours) for self feeding, and the other takes short trips (about three hours long) to feed the chicks. The bimodality of the length of foraging trips is likely to be because it is the optimal balance of self-feeding and provisioning for chicks. On Christmas Island, birds generally forage far out to sea in the early morning and closer to shore in the afternoon.

Squid and flying fish make up a large portion of this bird's diet, along with some crustaceans, depending on location. Fieldwork in the Mozambique Channel revealed the diet of birds there to be mostly fish by mass but equal numbers of fish and squid caught. Fish recorded include the mirrorwing flyingfish (Hirundichthys speculiger) and spotfin flyingfish (Cheilopogon furcatus) and several other unidentified species of the flying fish family Exocoetidae, the pompano dolphinfish (Coryphaena equiselis) and common dolphinfish (C. hippurus), needlefish including the houndfish (Tylosurus crocodilus), and unidentified members of Hemiramphidae, Scombridae, and Carangidae. The purpleback flying squid (Sthenoteuthis oualaniensis) was by far the most common cephalopod eaten, followed by the common blanket octopus (Tremoctopus violaceus). A field study in Hawaii found flying fish dominated the prey species, the tropical two-wing flyingfish (Exocoetus volitans) and members of the genus Cypselurus prominent, followed by squid of the family Ommastrephidae including the purpleback flying squid and the glass squid (Hyaloteuthis pelagica), and carangid fish including the shortfin scad (Decapterus macrosoma). The red-tailed tropicbird has also been recorded eating porcupinefish (Diodontidae), although adults have been troubled when the victim fish inflates resulting in it being urgently regurgitated.

A strong flyer with large mouth and bill, the red-tailed tropicbird can carry relatively large prey for its size, parent birds commonly bearing dolphin fish that weighed 120 g—16% of their own weight—to their chicks.

=== Temperature regulation ===
When incubating during the day in a shaded nest, this bird has an average temperature of 39 °C (102 °F), compared to its average temperature when incubating at night of 37.1 °C (98.8 °F). The difference is likely due to activity levels, as the air temperature during these times does not differ significantly with a bird in the nest. After flying, the average body temperature is 40.9 °C (105.6 °F). The temperature of the feet is always lower than that of the body temperature during flight, but always higher than the air temperature. Thus, the feet are likely used to dissipate heat during flight.

== Relationship with humans ==
The red-tailed tropicbird's tail streamers were highly prized by the Māori, as inherited from the sensibilities of other Polynesian islands that coveted red feathers in general as a simbol of mana and authority like the Marquesas; the Ngāpuhi tribe of the Northland Region would look for and collect them off dead or stray birds blown ashore after easterly gales, trading them for pounamu from South Island tribes. English naturalist Andrew Bloxam reported that the feathers were just as valued in Hawaii, where the locals would pull them off the birds as they nested.

== Status ==
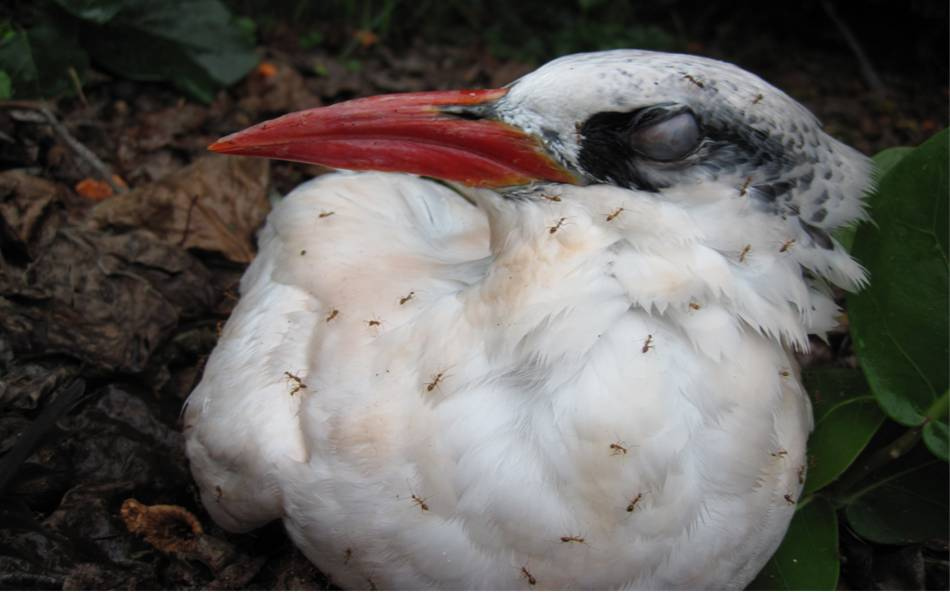
Being swarmed by yellow crazy ants, Johnston Atoll

The red-tailed tropicbird is classified as a least-concern species according to the IUCN on account of its large range of up to 20 thousand square kilometres (7,700 mi^{2}). The population in the eastern Pacific has been estimated to be as high as 80,000 birds with a minimum of 41,000 birds. Around 9,000 birds breed on Europa Island, and 9,000–12,000 breed on the Hawaiian islands. Human presence generally affects the species adversely, by the destruction of habitat or introduction of pests. Within Australia, it is classified as near threatened, due to unexpected declines in some populations, the impact of humans, and the yellow crazy ant overrunning Christmas Island. It is listed as vulnerable in New South Wales.

Predators recorded in Western Australia include large raptors such as the white-bellied sea eagle (Haliaeetus leucogaster) and the eastern osprey (Pandion cristatus); while silver gulls, and crows and ravens (Corvus spp.) raid nests for eggs and young. Vagrant red-billed tropicbirds (P. aethereus) have been implicated in egg loss of nests in Hawaii. Feral dogs and cats prey on nesting birds on Christmas Island, while feral cats are a severe problem on Norfolk Island. Rats have been a serious problem on Kure Atoll, causing heavy losses. Yellow crazy ants were discovered on Johnston Atoll in the north Pacific Ocean in 2010, hordes of which overrun nesting areas and can blind victims with their spray.

Also on Johnston Atoll, the Johnston Atoll Chemical Agent Disposal System (JACADS) was burning stockpiled chemical weapons until 2000. It was studied over eight years to see if there were effects from potential contaminants. There appeared to be no impact on survival during the study period, although young birds from downwind of the plant were less likely to return there than those upwind of the plant—possibly due to the more intact vegetation at the latter site.

Scientists studying the bird on Lady Elliot Island off the Queensland coast in 2020 say that the lack of knowledge about its habits and populations means that they don't know how much environmental changes are affecting its populations. Their study includes taking DNA samples, banding new chicks and fitting birds with satellite trackers, in a bit to find out more about their movements.
