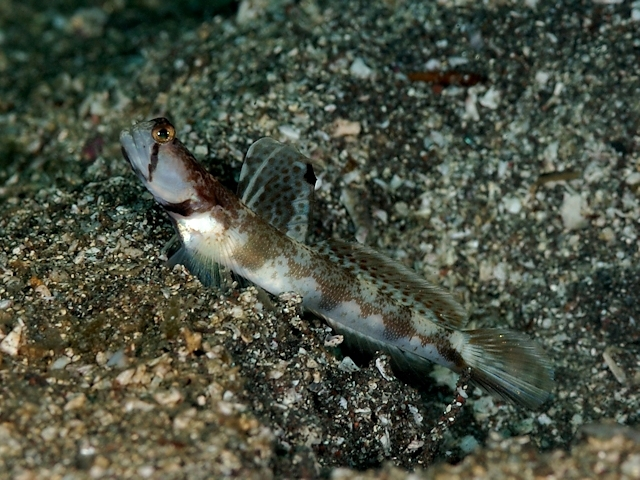
- Tomiyamichthys oni

Scientific classification
- Kingdom: Animalia
- Phylum: Chordata
- Class: Actinopterygii
- Order: Gobiiformes
- Family: Gobiidae
- Genus: Tomiyamichthys; J. L. B. Smith, 1956

Type species
- Cryptocentrus oni Tomiyama, 1936

Synonyms
- Eilatia Klausewitz, 1974; Flabelligobius Smith, 1956

= Tomiyamichthys =

Genus of fishes

Tomiyamichthys is a genus of gobies found from the Red Sea through the Indian Ocean to the western Pacific Ocean.

== Etymology ==
The name of this genus honours the Japanese ichthyologist Itiro Tomiyama of the Tokyo Imperial University, who described the type species, Tomiyamichthys oni, in 1936.

== Species ==
These are the current recognized species in this genus:

- Tomiyamichthys alleni Iwata, Ohnishi & Hirata, 2000 (Allen's shrimpgoby)
- Tomiyamichthys dorsostigma Bogorodsky, Kovačić & J. E. Randall, 2011
- Tomiyamichthys elliotensis G. R. Allen, Erdmann & Dudgeon, 2023(Lady Elliot Shrimp Goby, 2023)
- Tomiyamichthys emilyae Gerald R. Allen, Mark V. Erdmann & Ilham Vemandra Utama, 2019
- Tomiyamichthys fourmanoiri (J. L. B. Smith, 1956)
- Tomiyamichthys gomezi G. R. Allen & Erdmann, 2012 (Gomez' shrimpgoby)
- Tomiyamichthys lanceolatus (Yanagisawa, 1978) (Lanceolate shrimpgoby)
- Tomiyamichthys latruncularius (Klausewitz, 1974) (Fan shrimpgoby)
- Tomiyamichthys levisquama Hoese, Shibukawa & J. W. Johnson, 2016
- Tomiyamichthys nudus G. R. Allen & Erdmann, 2012 (Scale-less shrimpgoby)
- Tomiyamichthys oni (Tomiyama, 1936) (Monster shrimpgoby)
- Tomiyamichthys praealta (Lachner & McKinney, 1981) (Tall-fin shrimpgoby)
- Tomiyamichthys russus (Cantor, 1849) (Ocellated shrimpgoby)
- Tomiyamichthys smithi (I. S. Chen & L. S. Fang, 2003) (Smith's shrimpgoby)
- Tomiyamichthys tanyspilus J. E. Randall & I. S. Chen, 2007 (Long-spot shrimpgoby)
- Tomiyamichthys zonatus G. R. Allen, 2015 (Brown-band shrimpgoby)
