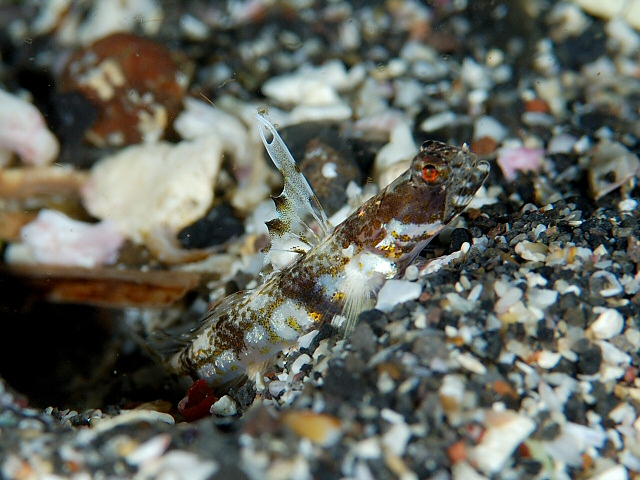

Conservation status
- Data Deficient (IUCN 3.1)

Scientific classification
- Kingdom: Animalia
- Phylum: Chordata
- Class: Actinopterygii
- Order: Gobiiformes
- Family: Gobiidae
- Genus: Tomiyamichthys
- Species: T. alleni

Binomial name
- Tomiyamichthys alleni Iwata, Ohnishi & Hirata, 2000

= Tomiyamichthys alleni =

Species of fish

Tomiyamichthys alleni, Allen's shrimpgoby, is a species of ray-finned fish from the family Gobiidae. It occurs in the western Pacific Ocean where it is commensal with an aplheid shrimp.

== Description ==
Tomiyamichthys alleni has meristic counts of 6-7 spines and 10 soft rays in the dorsal fins and a single spine and 10 soft rays in the anal fin. It is pale grey on the back with 4-5 irregular brown saddle-like blotches running from the nape to the caudal peduncle and the ventral side is white. There is a scattering of orange spots with darke margins on the head and body and there is an oblique black band under each eye. The first and second dorsal fins are marked with orange spots orange spots and there are 2-3 dark spots close to the margin of the first dorsal fin. The first dorsal fin is triangular in shape with the first two spines being elongated. The pelvic fins are merged and there is a well developed frenum. The lateral scales number 25-50, the heaf lacks scales and is naked while the body is covered in cycloid scales. It has a rounded caudal fin which is shorter than the length of its head.

== Distribution ==
Tomiyamichthys alleni is known to occur in the western Pacific Ocean where it has been recorded from Flores and Bali, in Indonesia, and also from waters off southern Japan.

== Habitat and biology ==
Tomiyamichthys alleni is found where there are fine sandy bottoms living in association with alpheid shrimp Alpheus randalli, and it has been recorded in pairs. It occurs at depths of 15–40 metres (49–131 ft).

== Conservation ==
Tomiyamichthys alleni is known from just 8 specimens and a number of photographs and very little is known about its actual distribution and population, the IUCN therefore assesses its status as Data Deficient.

== Etymology ==
The specific name and the common name honour the Australian ichthyologist Gerald R. Allen of the Western Australia Museum in Perth, to mark the senior author's gratitude to Allen for his assistance in the study of gobies.
