= Sugarloaf Rock (Western Australia) =

Rock in south west Western Australia

Sugarloaf Rock, also known as Sugar Loaf Rock and Sugarloaf Rocks, is a large, natural granite island in the Indian Ocean just off the coast, situated approximately 2 kilometres (1.2 mi) south of Cape Naturaliste in the South West region of Western Australia.

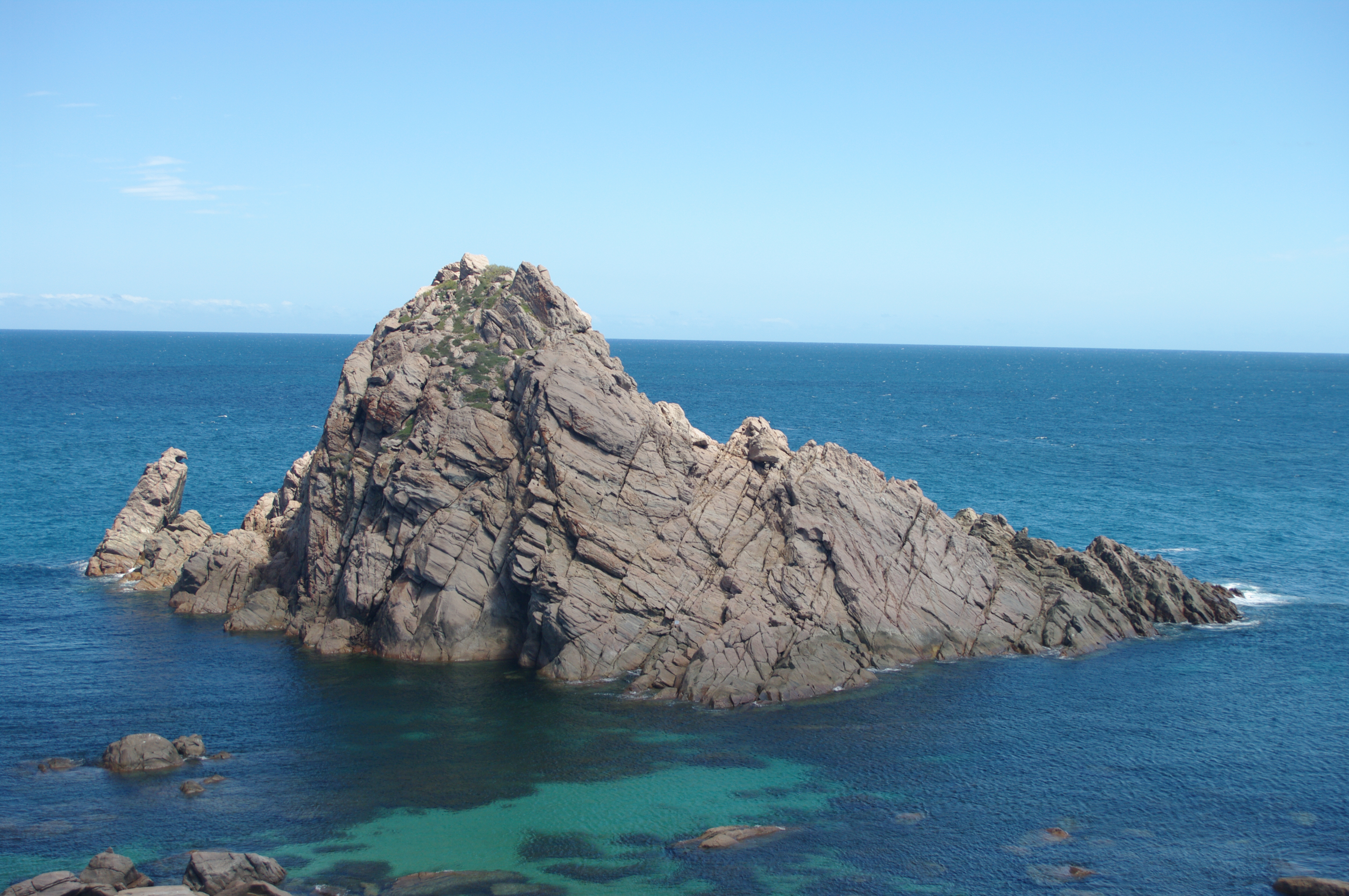
Sugarloaf Rock

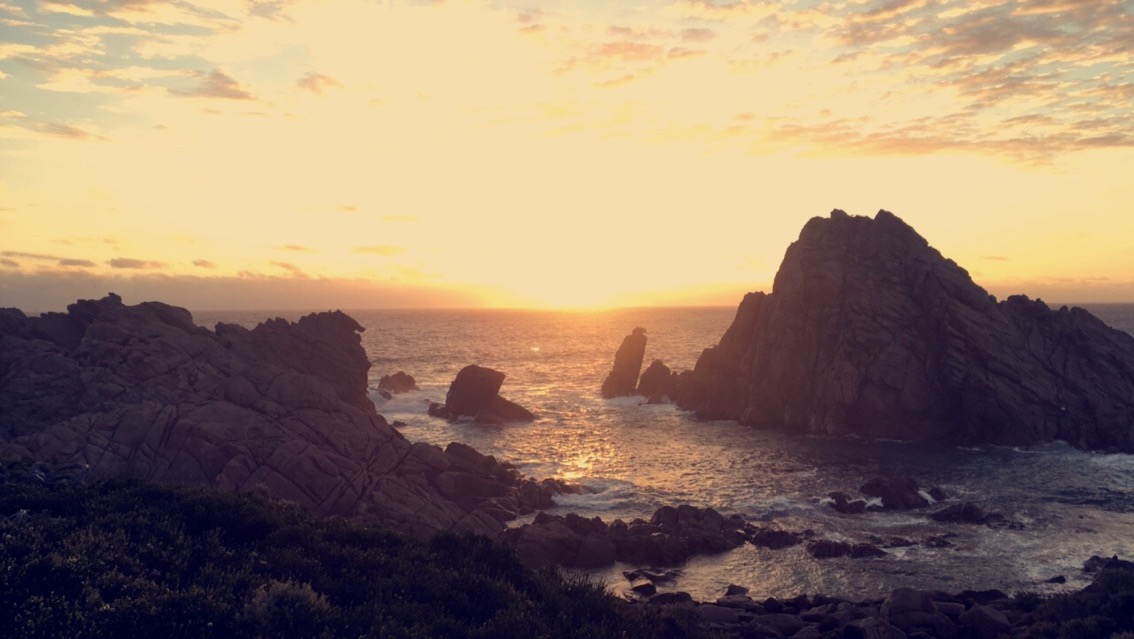
Sugarloaf Rock at sunset

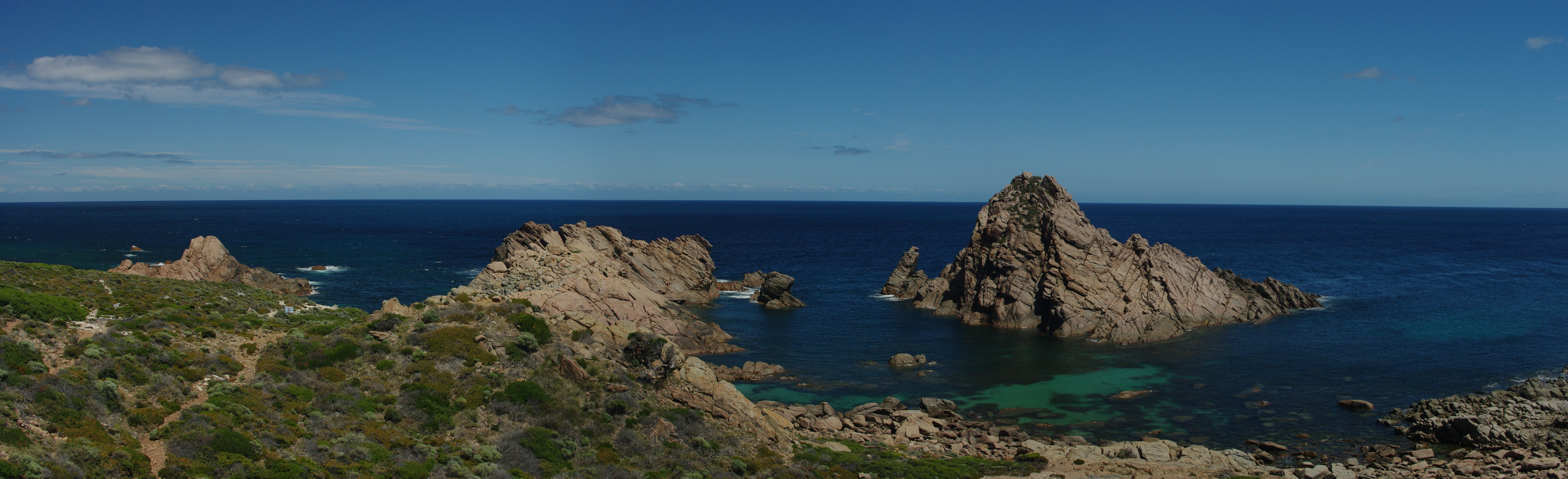
Sugarloaf Rock and coastline

It is separated from the mainland by a thin channel of water. The rock is one of the most photographed attractions and it has appeared on the cover of the Australian Geographic magazine.

The rock derives its name from the distinctive conical shape reminiscent of an old-style sugarloaf. It is designated as a nature reserve and a nesting site for seabirds such as the red-tailed tropicbird. The Cape to Cape track passes by the lookout to the rock.

Access to the rock was limited with no road down to the shore present until the mid-1930s; the site was not well known in 1932, with visitors having to "scramble through thickets and down the cliff" to access the coast. The first recorded drowning off the rock occurred in 1934 when a man was washed from it. A danger sign was erected near the site later the same year. Two more fishermen drowned when they were washed off the rock in 1940, with a third surviving by clinging to a ledge then raising the alarm.
