= Lady Elliot Island =

Coral cay located in the Great Barrier Reef

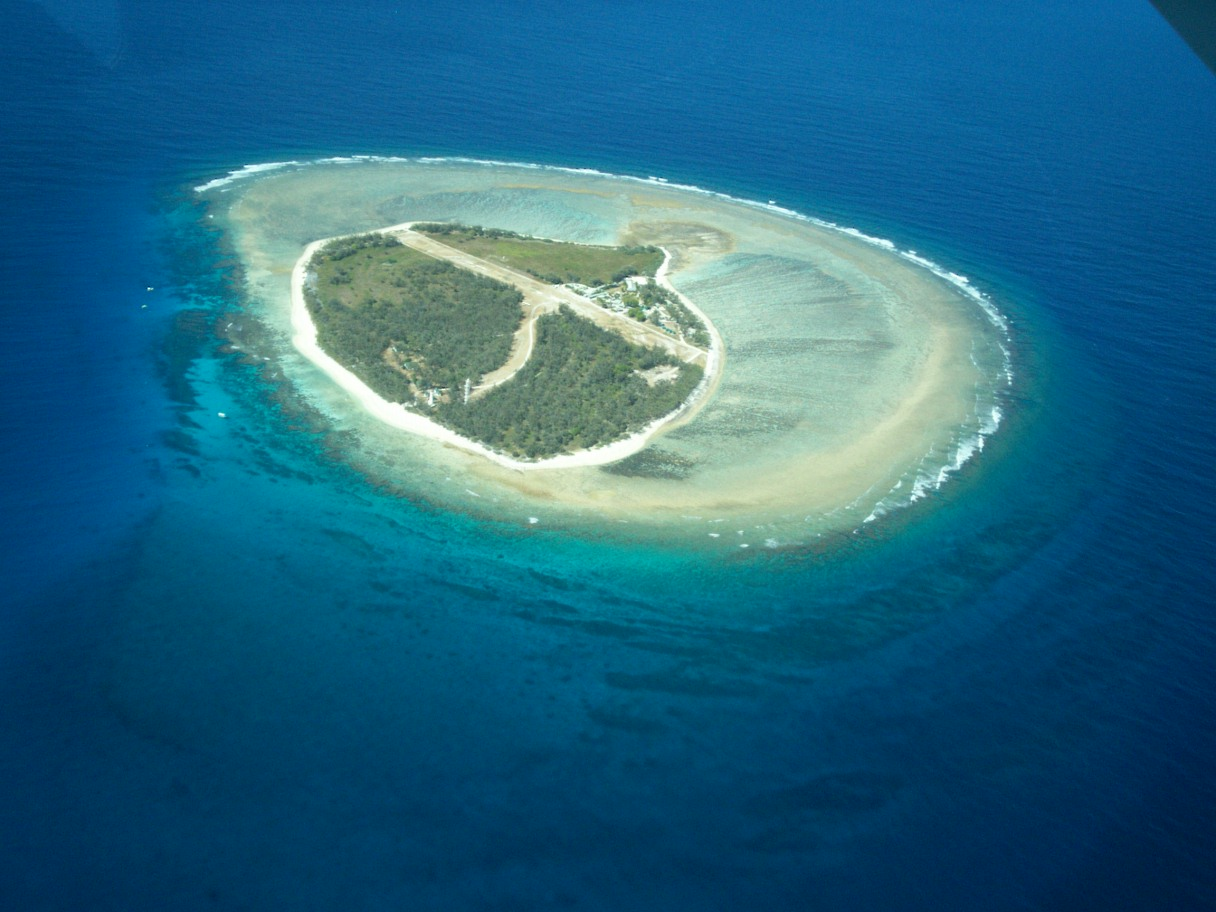
- Lady Elliot Island as seen from the air

- Location within Queensland Location within Australia

Geography
- Location: Coral Sea
- Coordinates: 24°07′S 152°43′E
- Archipelago: Capricorn and Bunker Group
- Area: 0.69 km^{2} (0.27 sq mi)

Administration
- Australia
- Region: Central Queensland

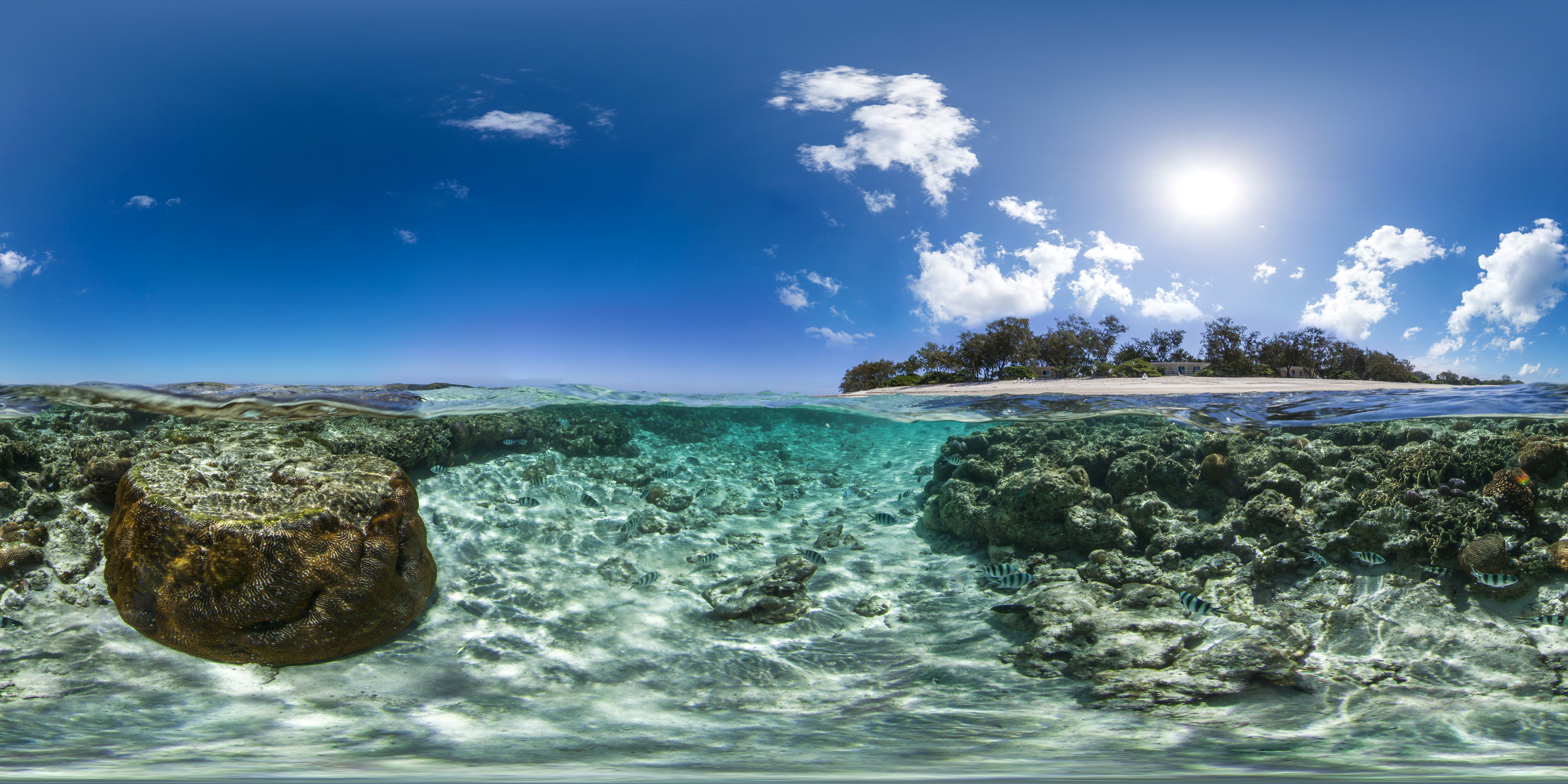
An image of the island and nearby coral reefs taken with the Seaview SVII camera

Lady Elliot Island is the southernmost coral cay of the Great Barrier Reef, Australia. The island lies 46 nautical miles (85 km; 53 mi) north-east of Bundaberg and covers an area of approximately 45 hectares (110 acres). It is part of the Capricorn and Bunker Group of islands and is owned by the Commonwealth of Australia. The island is home to a small eco resort and an airstrip, which is serviced daily by flights from Bundaberg, Hervey Bay, Brisbane and the Gold Coast.

Lady Elliot Island is located within the 'Green Zone' of the Great Barrier Reef Marine Park, which is the highest possible classification designated by the Great Barrier Reef Marine Park Authority. Marine National Park Green Zones protect the biodiversity within the Great Barrier Reef Marine Park by protecting important breeding and nursery areas such as seagrass beds, mangrove communities, deepwater shoals and reefs.

The island is particularly renowned for its scuba diving and snorkelling, as its location far offshore at the southern end of the Great Barrier Reef results in excellent water clarity.

== Flora ==
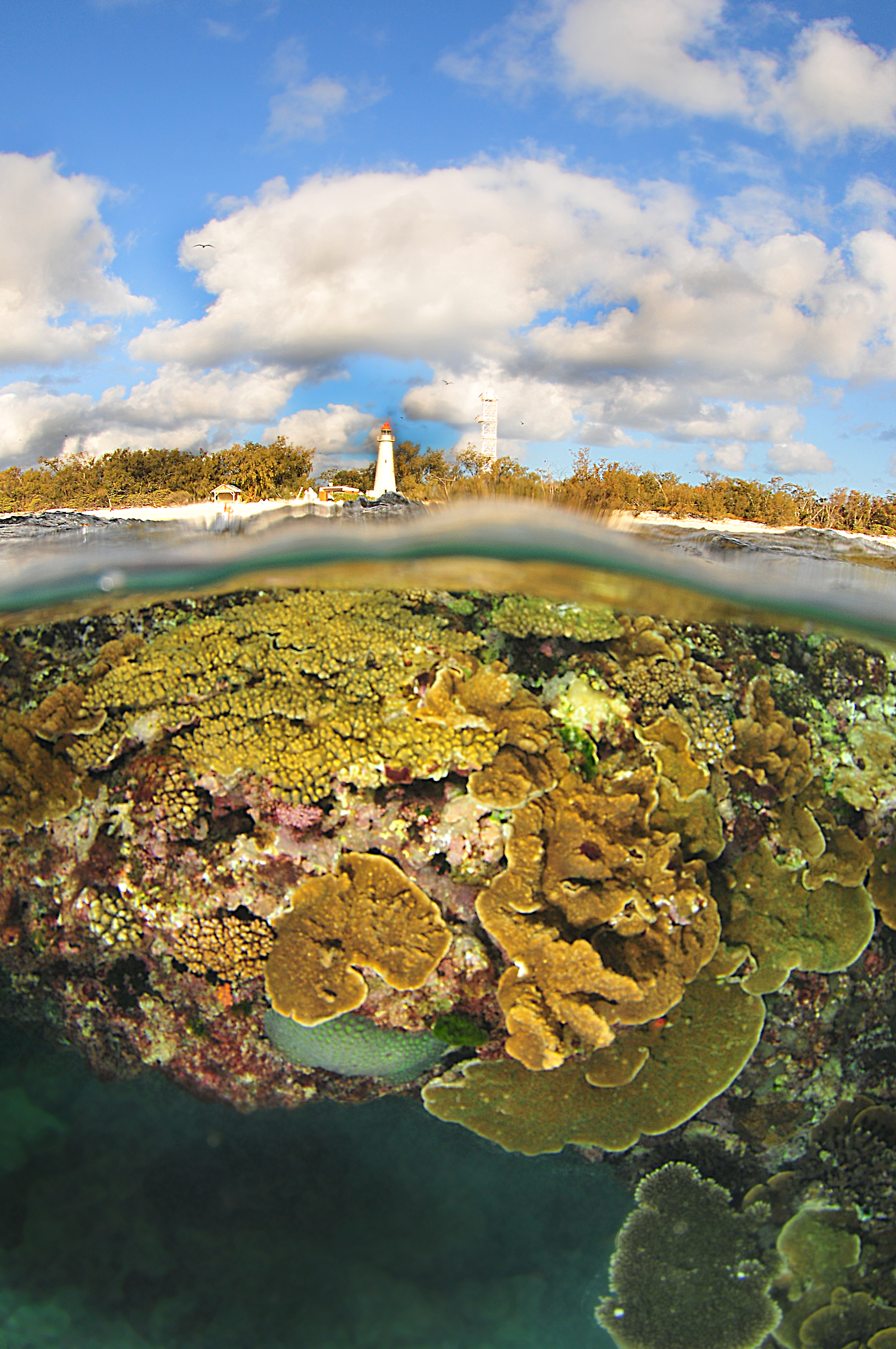
Old Lighthouse and underwater reef

The island is a vegetated shingle cay, which is uncommon. Typically these types of cays are too narrow to retain fresh water or too mobile for vegetation to take hold. Pisonia grandis grows on the island.

== Fauna ==
The waters surrounding the island are particularly rich in sealife because of a total ban on fishing or taking anything from the surrounding waters. Manta rays are abundant, attracted to the plankton around the island. The speckled carpetshark is often observed in the waters around the island. It is the only known locality home to the Lady Elliot Shrimp Goby (Tomiyamichthys elliotensis) which was described in 2023.

=== Turtles ===
The Great Barrier Reef is one of the most important sea turtle habitats in the world, with Lady Elliot Island being a key part of that habitat. Every year between November and March the green and loggerhead turtles lumber up the same beach on which they were born more than 50 years ago. These turtles nest on Lady Elliot Island up to nine times in a season, laying between 80 and 120 eggs per clutch. About eight to twelve weeks later, young hatchlings leave their nests and head towards the ocean (January to April).

=== Whales ===
Lady Elliot Island is just north of Hervey Bay, a popular humpback whale resting ground along their migration route. Whales are common in the waters around the island in the winter and early spring from June to October. Regular sightings occur on the flights to the island, and while snorkelling and diving from boats and from the island's beaches. Almost daily during the season, whale songs can be heard under the water while swimming around the island.

=== Birds ===
Lady Elliot Island has one of the highest seabird diversity of any island within the Great Barrier Reef. The Capricorn silvereye, a small bird endemic to the southern Great Barrier Reef, is found on the island, which is also home to the buff-banded rail. It is an important seabird nesting site. The cay is a haven for over fifty species of tropical seabirds and wading birds. Over 100,000 birds nest on Lady Elliot Island during summer breeding season.

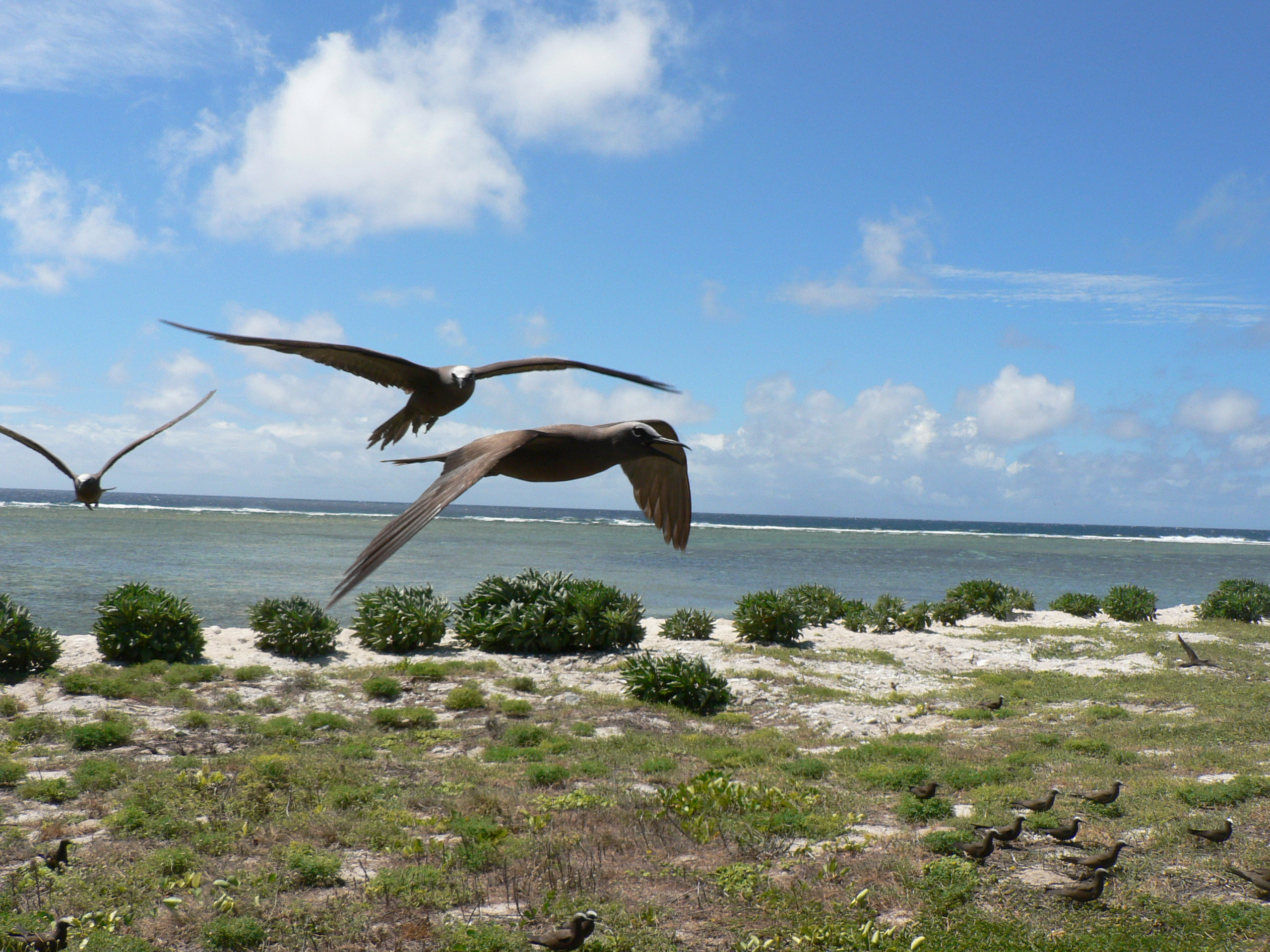
Black noddies on Lady Elliot Island

Seabirds that nest on Lady Elliot Island include:

- Brown booby
- Lesser frigatebird
- Terns: black-naped, bridled, crested, roseate, sooty
- Black noddy
- Red-tailed tropicbird
- Silver gull
- Wedge-tailed shearwater
- Pacific reef heron

== History ==
=== Origin ===
Lady Elliot Island first appeared above sea level around 1500 BC as a coral rubble spit. It developed into a mature coral cay over the next 3,000 years. Lady Elliot had endured because bird droppings have hardened together with beach sediments into beachrock. The existence of concentric shingle ridges across the island provides evidence of its formation by progradation over several millennia as deposits were laid down during episodic storms.

=== First commercial venture ===
In 1805, first commercial venture on Lady Elliot Island was the collecting of bêche-de-mer. The animals were removed from the shallow water, dried and smoked before being exported to South-East Asia. The industry petered out when there were no more sea cucumbers.

=== British discovery ===
In 1816, the island was officially discovered and named by Captain Thomas Stewart aboard the vessel Lady Elliot. on the way to Sydney in 1816. The Lady Elliot was a 353-tonne vessel that was built in Bengal and registered in Calcutta, India. On the return journey from Sydney, it was wrecked on a reef south of Cardwell in North Queensland, and that reef is called Lady Elliot Reef.

The ship was probably named after Anna Maria Elliot, the wife of Gilbert Elliot-Murray-Kynynmound, 1st Earl of Minto, a Scottish politician who was Governor-General of India between 1807 and 1813. Anna Maria (later Lady Elliot) was the daughter of Sir George Amyand, 1st Baronet. An alternative story suggests that it was named after Margaret, wife of Gilbert's brother, Hugh Elliot, a diplomat and Governor of Madras from September 1814 to June 1820. However, Hugh Elliot's wife was not a "Lady", as he was a career diplomat, was not knighted and did not inherit any titles of nobility.

=== Mining for guano ===
In 1863, Mr J. Askunas won a tender from the Queensland Government to mine the island for guano for 300 pounds per annum for 10 years. The lease was transferred to William Crowther of Hobart on 23 August 1864. Crowther mined the island until the end of 1873. The guano was mined by Chinese and Malay workers and sent to mainland Australia and New Zealand. Over that period, virtually all the trees were removed, as well as 3 feet (1 m) of top soil and guano. In 1874, guano mining ceased, but the damage to the vegetation of the island was extreme. It was not until 1966 that a revegetation program was undertaken by lighthouse staff. Their efforts were quickly rewarded, with the island re-emerging as a haven for all types of seabirds.

=== Lighthouse ===
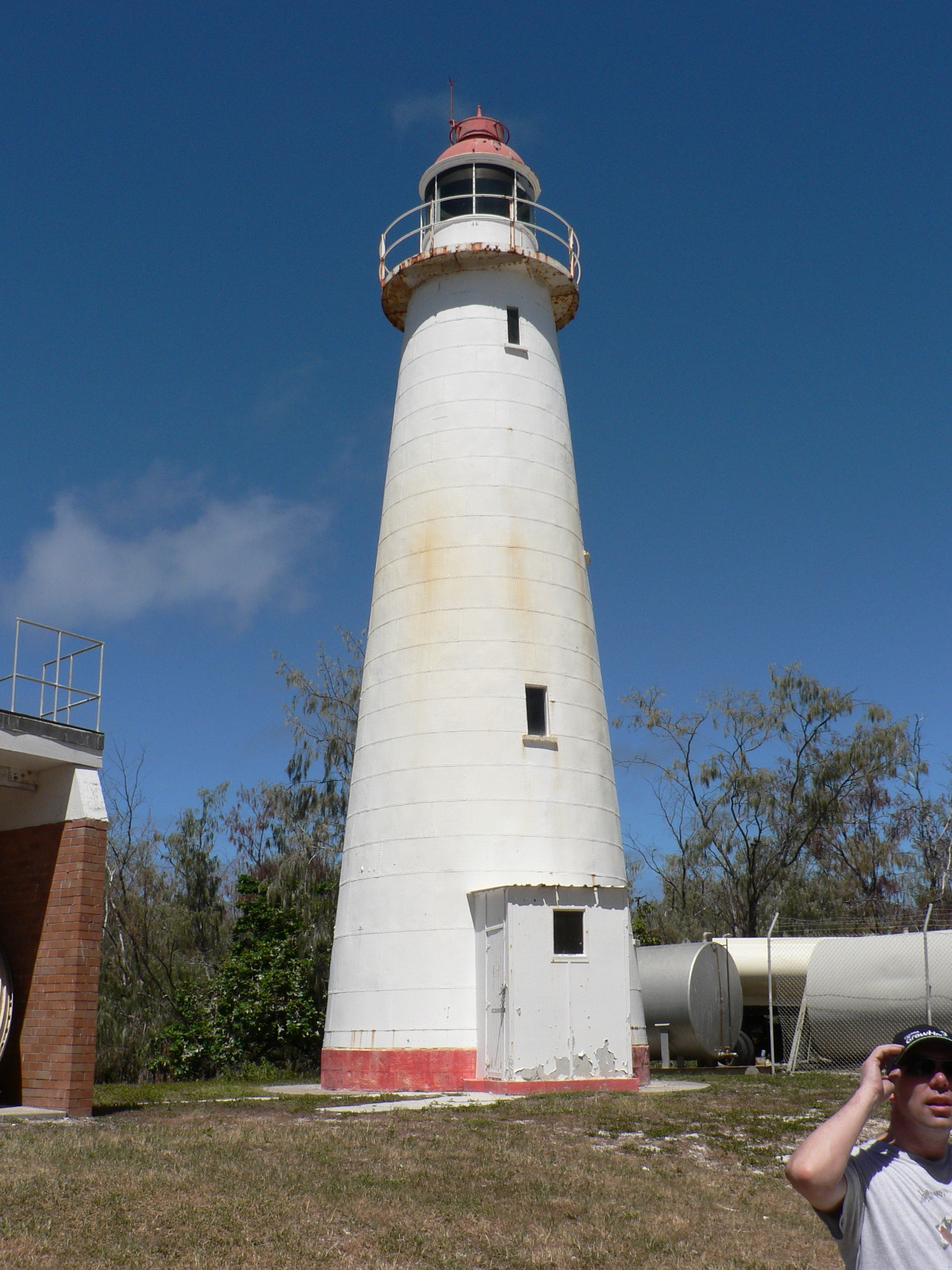
The old Lady Elliot Island Light

The first lighthouse to be built on the island was constructed in 1866. It was the third lighthouse built in Queensland and the first to be built offshore on the Great Barrier Reef. The original structure was destroyed by a cyclone six years later. In 1873, another lighthouse was constructed, Lady Elliot Island Light. The lighthouse is on the National Heritage list because it is a timber-framed construction with a cast iron cladding, which was premade in England and shipped to the island in pieces. This lighthouse is 15 metres (49 ft) tall and shone out approximately 30 kilometres (19 mi) to sea. The old lighthouse was used continuously until 1995 but became too short for the surrounding vegetation, which was interrupting the beam of light. At this time the Australian Maritime Safety Authority built a new light tower. It is 21 metres (69 ft) tall and its six light beams shine 40 kilometres (25 mi) out to sea. It is solar powered, fully automated and runs continuously. The original lighthouse was placed on the Commonwealth Heritage List in 2004. The Lady Elliot Island Lightstation Heritage Management Plan was developed by the Great Barrier Reef Marine Park Authority (GBRMPA) in March 2012 to protect, conserve and manage the Commonwealth Heritage values of the Lady Elliot Island lighthouse.

=== Airstrip and resort ===

In 1969, Don Adams (who later went on to found Seabird Aviation) built accommodation for the island, along with a grass air strip, which continues to be used in the 2020s. The resort provides guided activities on the island include reef walking, glass bottom boat trips, snorkel tours, island history tours, bird watching tours and turtle treks, when in season. Lady Elliot Island Eco Resort has also the highest level of ECO Certification program 'ECO Certified – Advanced Ecotourism' with Ecotourism Australia. Tourist services to the island are provided by Seair Pacific.

== Administration and infrastructure ==
Lady Elliot Island is one of 21 islands in the Great Barrier Reef Marine Park governed by the Great Barrier Reef Marine Park Authority The island also maintained by Lady Elliot Island Eco Resort.

Don Adams was granted the tourist recreation lease by the Australian Government and, in 1977, he sold the lease to Barrier Reef Airways. In 1984, the Australian Government called for tenders to construct a low-key resort on that island which was awarded to John and Judy French, with the resort opening in 1985. In 1992, the resort lease changed hands and was sold to Bevan Whittaker. In 2005, the original 20-year resort lease came up for renewal and was put to tender. The tender was won by three Gold Coast businessmen—Peter Gash, Grant Kenny and Michael Kyle. A new lease was granted for a 10-year period, with two options each for a further term of ten years. Since the change of lessee, a program to progressively renovate the island's facilities and make them more ecologically friendly has been implemented.

The island generates its own electricity via a hybrid solar power station, which powers the island's desalination and wastewater processor. A study by Griffith University found the island's energy was 100% renewable by 2020. Energy is also used to power an on-site composting apparatus which turns food waste into compost, which is then used to help revegetate the island.

== Climate ==
Lady Elliot Island has a tropical savanna climate (Aw).

Climate data for Lady Elliot Island
Month	Jan	Feb	Mar	Apr	May	Jun	Jul	Aug	Sep	Oct	Nov	Dec	Year
Record high °C (°F)	33.9 (93.0)	33.7 (92.7)	33.0 (91.4)	31.2 (88.2)	28.8 (83.8)	27.4 (81.3)	26.4 (79.5)	28.1 (82.6)	28.4 (83.1)	29.5 (85.1)	31.3 (88.3)	32.9 (91.2)	33.9 (93.0)
Mean daily maximum °C (°F)	29.9 (85.8)	29.7 (85.5)	28.9 (84.0)	27.1 (80.8)	24.5 (76.1)	22.4 (72.3)	21.8 (71.2)	22.7 (72.9)	24.7 (76.5)	26.3 (79.3)	27.9 (82.2)	29.1 (84.4)	26.3 (79.3)
Mean daily minimum °C (°F)	24.4 (75.9)	24.4 (75.9)	23.7 (74.7)	22.0 (71.6)	19.5 (67.1)	17.7 (63.9)	16.8 (62.2)	17.3 (63.1)	19.1 (66.4)	20.5 (68.9)	22.1 (71.8)	23.4 (74.1)	20.9 (69.6)
Record low °C (°F)	16.4 (61.5)	17.4 (63.3)	16.7 (62.1)	13.7 (56.7)	11.9 (53.4)	7.9 (46.2)	8.1 (46.6)	6.8 (44.2)	9.5 (49.1)	12.4 (54.3)	14.9 (58.8)	16.2 (61.2)	6.8 (44.2)
Average rainfall mm (inches)	84.0 (3.31)	130.6 (5.14)	93.7 (3.69)	88.4 (3.48)	111.3 (4.38)	87.7 (3.45)	69.1 (2.72)	46.4 (1.83)	42.1 (1.66)	52.6 (2.07)	48.2 (1.90)	101.9 (4.01)	956 (37.64)
Source: Australian Bureau of Meteorology

== See also ==
- List of islands of Australia
