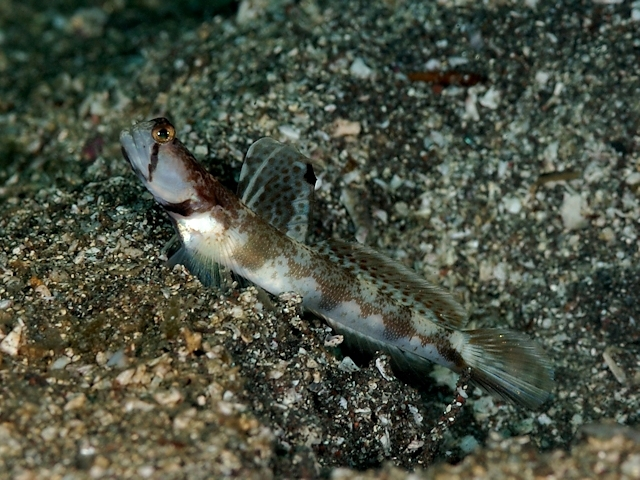

Conservation status
- Least Concern (IUCN 3.1)

Scientific classification
- Kingdom: Animalia
- Phylum: Chordata
- Class: Actinopterygii
- Order: Gobiiformes
- Family: Gobiidae
- Genus: Tomiyamichthys
- Species: T. oni

Binomial name
- Tomiyamichthys oni (Tomiyama, 1936)

Synonyms
- Cryptocentrus oni Tomiyama, 1936

= Tomiyamichthys oni =

Species of fish

Tomiyamichthys oni, the monster shrimpgoby, is a species of goby in the family Gobiidae. It is found in the western Pacific Ocean, including Japan, New Guinea, Indonesia, Philippine Islands, Sabah, Palau, and New Caledonia.

== Description ==
Tomiyamichthys oni reaches a standard length of 11.0 cm (4.3 in).
