= Seaview, New Brunswick =

Coordinates: 45°09′39″N 66°11′30″W

Seaview is a small Canadian coastal community located in the western part of Saint John County, New Brunswick.

It is located within the boundaries of the city of Saint John.

== See also ==
- List of neighbourhoods in New Brunswick
