= Seaview SVII =

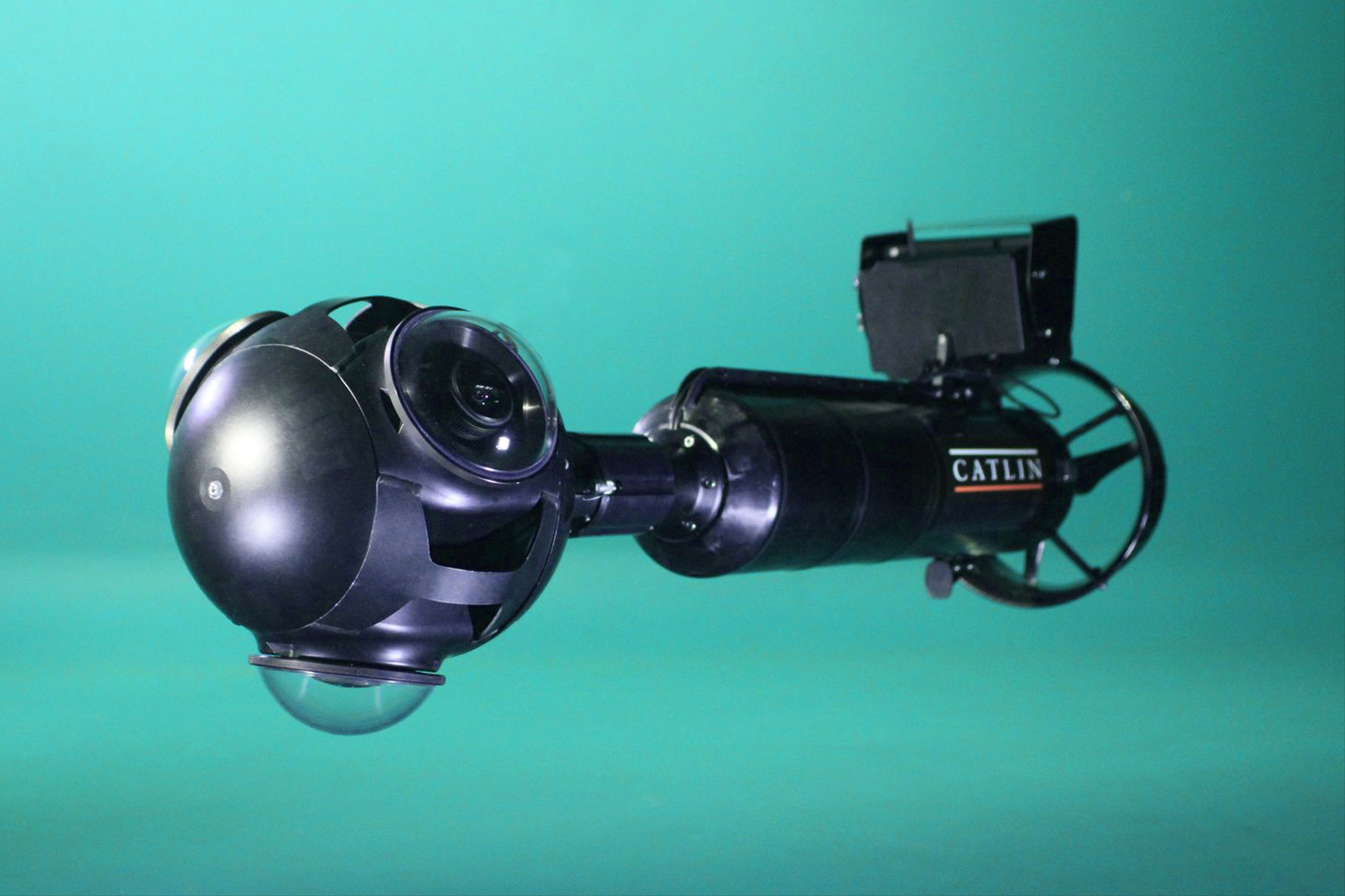
- The Seaview SVII camera

Overview
- Maker: Catlin Seaview Survey team
- Type: Underwater panoramic

Sensor/medium
- Maximum resolution: 360-degree panorama, 9500x4750 pixels

Shutter
- Frame rate: 1 image every 3–6 seconds
- Continuous shooting: Length of dive

General
- LCD screen: Samsung Galaxy Tab

The Seaview SVII is an underwater camera designed by the Catlin Seaview Survey team, intended to photograph coral reefs to provide visual documentation of a reef's health. The camera is designed to be controlled by a diver in shallow waters, and is propelled at a constant slow speed by a propeller mounted near the rear of the camera. Only two SVIIs are currently in existence. The cameras were used by the Catlin Seaview Survey and Google to create Google Ocean, a means of displaying underwater images using Google's existing Street View platform.

== Purpose ==
The SVII camera was designed as a replacement for its prototype predecessor, the SVI, to take thousands of images of the shallow waters of the Great Barrier Reef and other endangered coral reefs around the world. The imagery and data generated by the camera and its operators is intended to provide a visual record of the health of the reefs, creating a baseline record for the reefs' health to be compared to future surveys. Additionally, the images will be made available by Google using the Google Maps Street View platform, to increase public awareness of the risks faced by coral reefs.

== Specifications ==
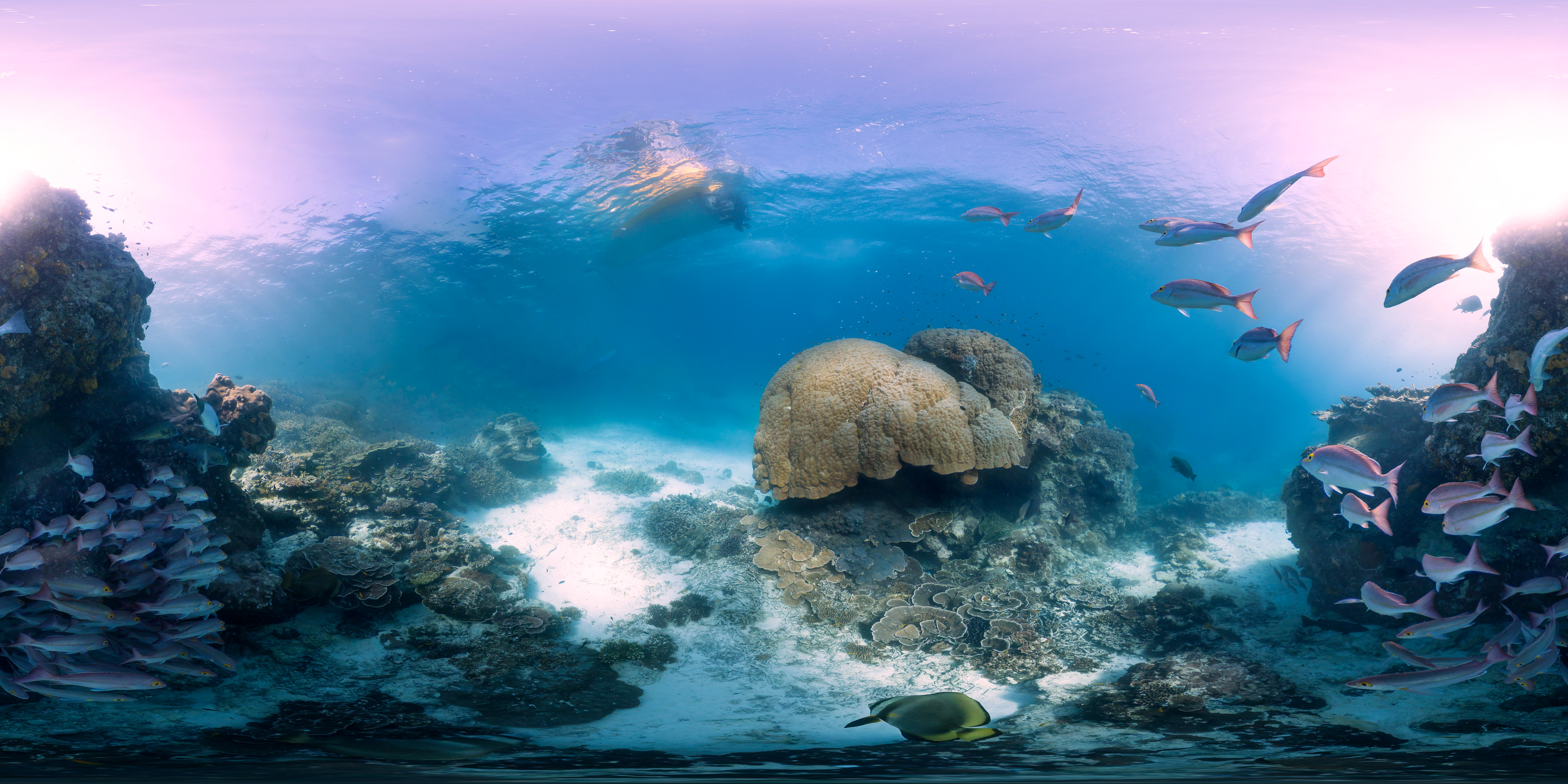
A panorama of Heron Bommie, near Heron Island, Queensland, taken using the SVII camera. (View as a 360° panorama)

The SVII is based upon its prototype, the SVI. Both cameras are self-propelling underwater housings for a set of three Canon 5D cameras using wide-angle lenses. With a top speed underwater of about 3–4 kilometres per hour (1.9–2.5 mph), the cameras record an image every 3–6 seconds and associate them with a geolocation coordinate. The images are then stitched together to create a 360-degree panorama of the area, in a format which can be uploaded online for public viewing.

The SVII is controlled by a Samsung Galaxy Tab tablet to permit the user to change settings, and download or view images. The improved design also allows users to recharge the camera more easily and quickly than with the SVI. While intended for more widespread use, there are currently four SVIIs in existence.

The SVII was invented and developed by Underwater Earth, in collaboration with Panedia and manufactured by ClaroWorks, the product development side of Dive Xtras. The SVII uses some technology developed by Dive Xtras / ClaroWorks; such as the underwater tablet housing and vehicle.

== Imagery ==
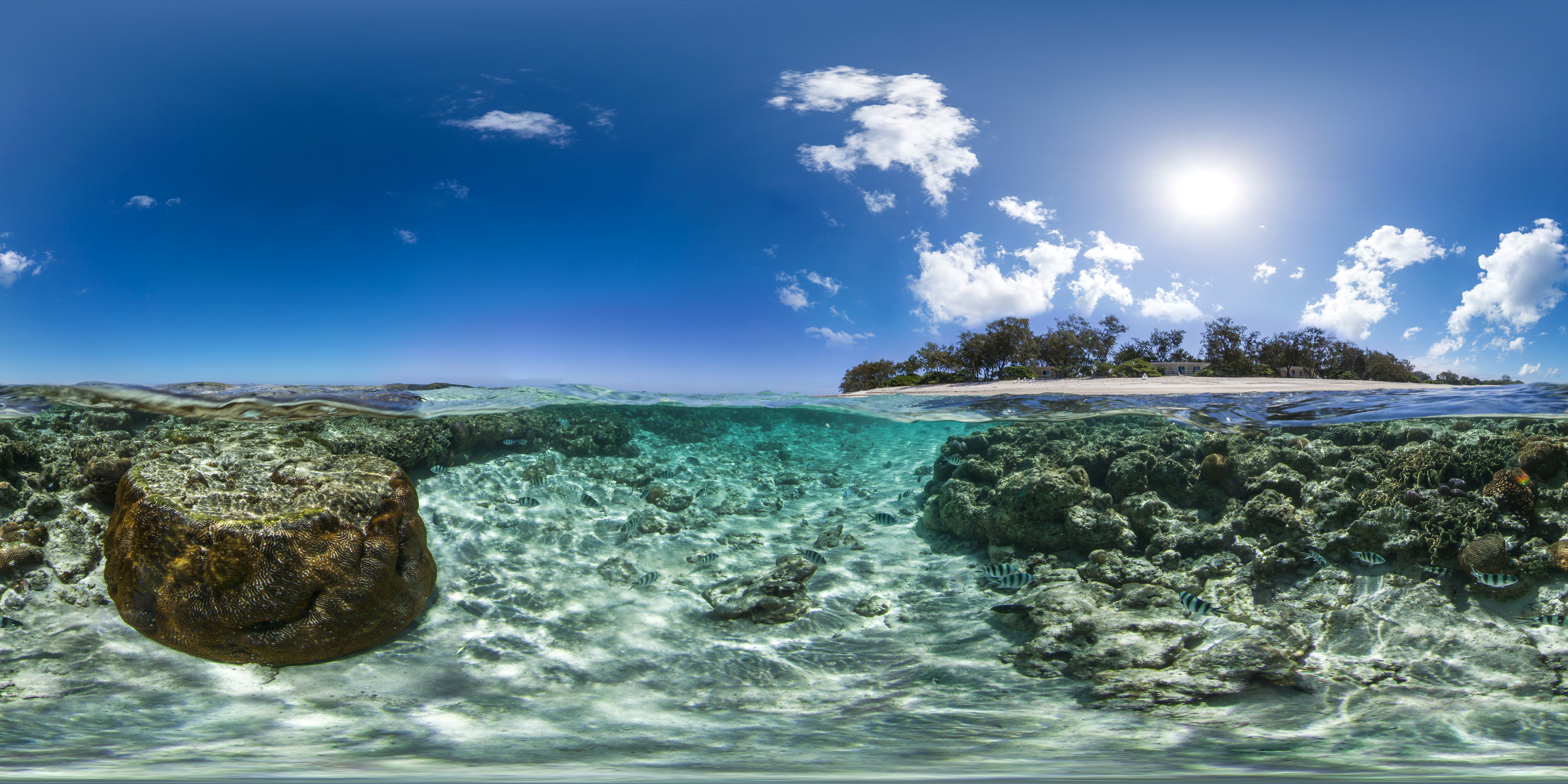
A panorama of the surface of the water near Lady Elliot Island, Queensland, taken using the SVII camera. The SVII is designed for use in shallower waters. (View as a 360° panorama)

Much of the imagery taken by the cameras is now available on Google Maps, for the following locations:

- Lady Elliot Island, Great Barrier Reef
- Heron Island, Great Barrier Reef
- Wilson Island, Great Barrier Reef
- Apo Island, Philippines
- Hanauma Bay, Hawaii
- Molokini, Hawaii
