= Catlin Seaview Survey =

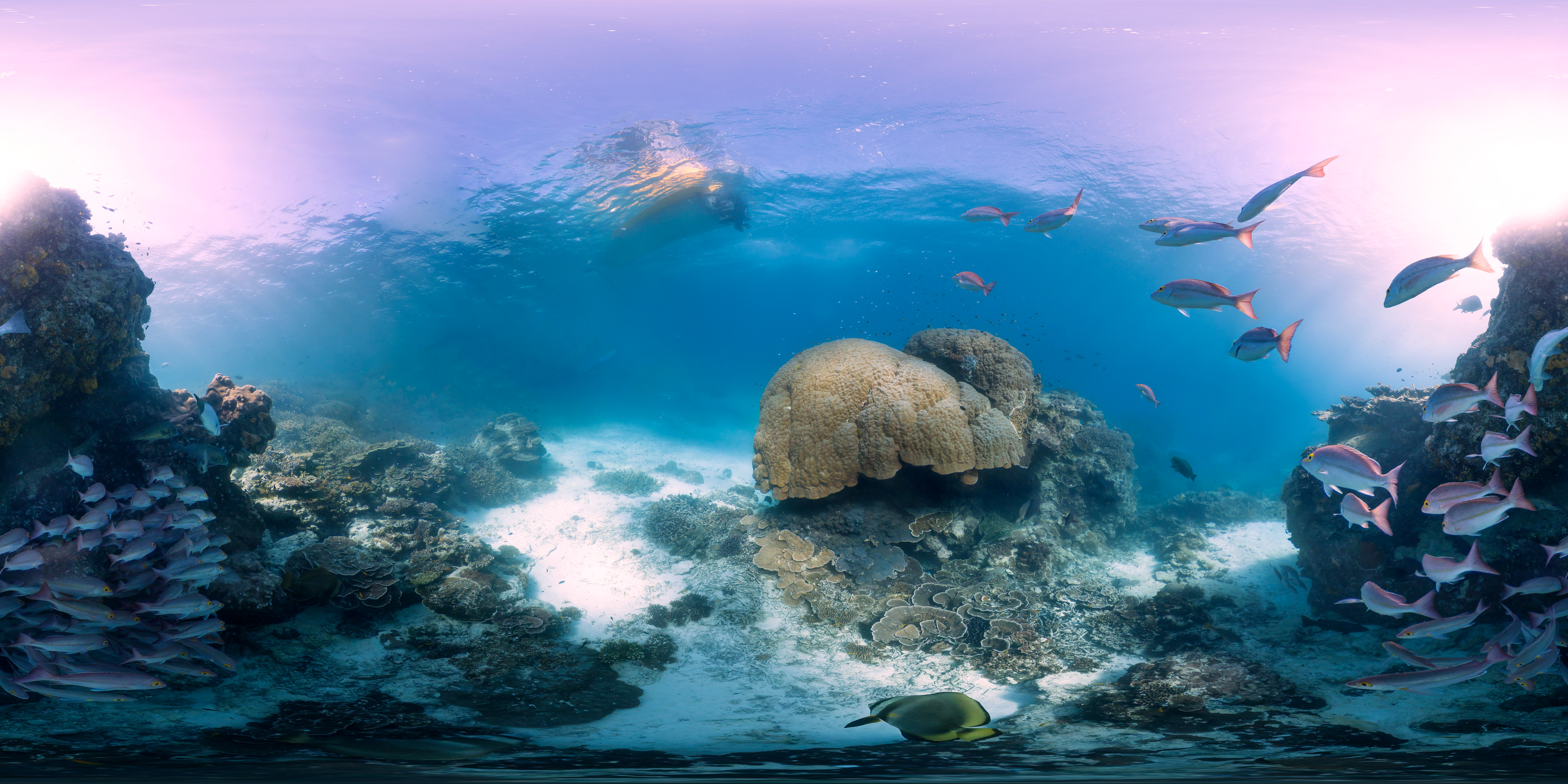
A panorama of the coral reef near Heron Island, taken as part of the Catlin Seaview Survey.

The Catlin Seaview Survey, later renamed the XL Catlin Seaview Survey, was a major scientific expedition which commenced in September 2012, whose aim was to document the composition and health of coral reefs worldwide. Specifically, the survey aimed to "carry out a rapid assessment of the current state of coral reef systems and to make this scientific record publicly available for scientists worldwide to use". The survey was sponsored by the Catlin Group until the survey ended when the Catlin group ended sponsorship. The original team created a film, chasing coral and a new, global initiative known as 50 reefs.

== History ==
The survey started in September 2012, and was focussed on sections of the Great Barrier Reef across a range of depths. Specifically, 32 reefs were sampled, which equated to approximately 150 kilometres (93 mi) of reef. This produced around 105,000 images, which are currently being analysed by scientists globally, using image recognition software. In addition to imaging shallow reefs, the deeper reef was sampled. This also led to the discovery of the deepest known coral reef in the Great Barrier Reef, which is located at a depth of 125 metres (410 ft).

This initial success led to the continuation of the survey globally. In 2013, the survey focussed on sampling corals in the Caribbean Sea and Bermuda. Other sites are also being explored in 2014.

== Surveying ==
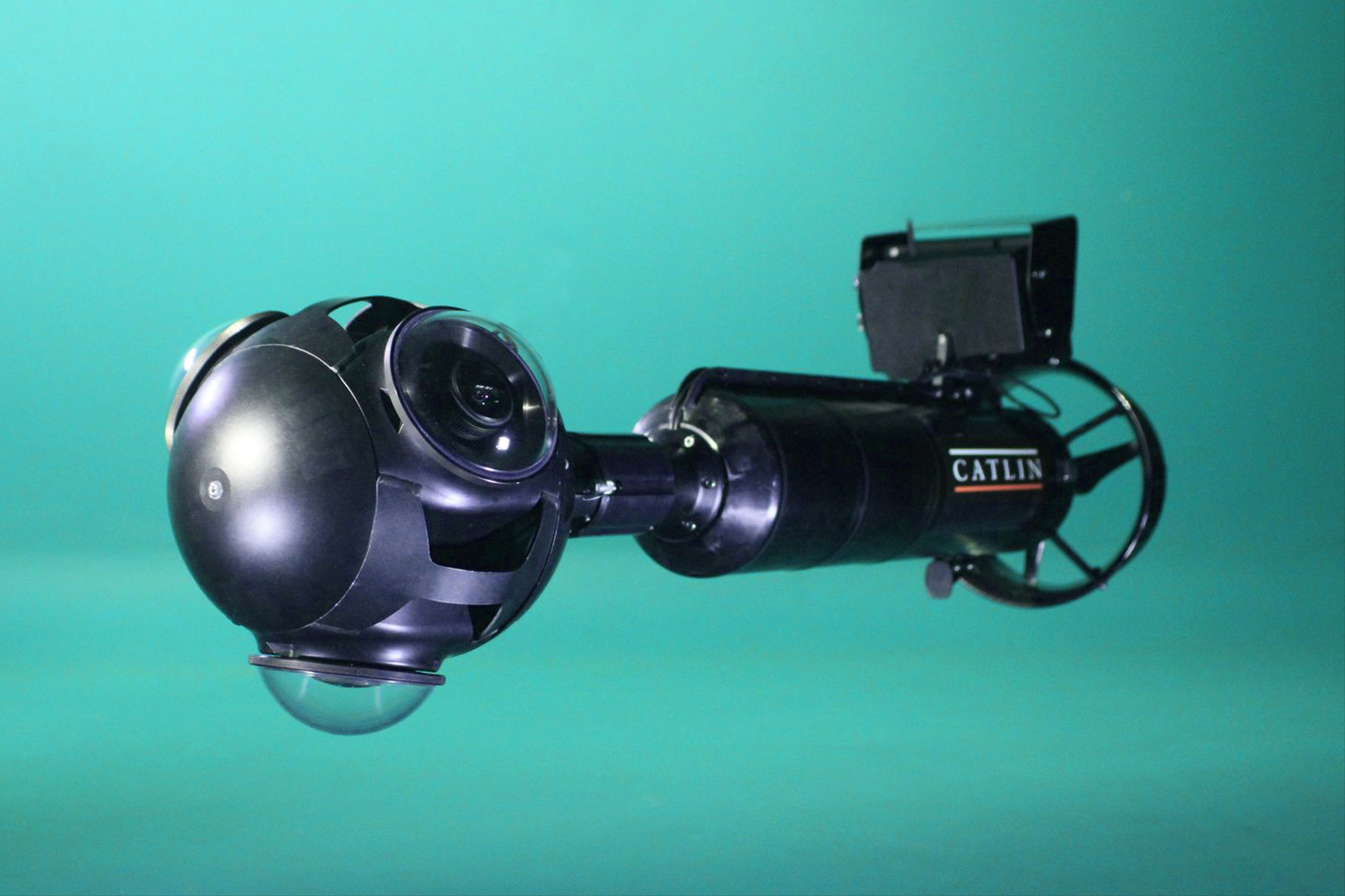
The Seaview SVII Camera, used extensively throughout the Catlin Seaview Survey.

The status of surveyed reefs is being documented using high-resolution, 360-degree panoramic vision. These images are GPS-tagged with camera direction recorded, documenting precise locations. This method of documentation is intended to form a visual record of the world's reefs, allowing different reefs to be visually compared, and individual reefs to be monitored over time. This imaging also aims to help both the general public and specific groups (e.g. policy makers) better identify and understand the threats facing coral reefs. Likewise, these images are intended to assist the formation of strategies to protect reefs.

To survey deeper reefs, specialist divers and remotely operated underwater vehicles (ROUVs) are being utilised. The temperatures of these deep reefs are also being monitored. In addition, biological samples are being collected to identify potential genetic links between shallow and deep coral systems, which could be important for conservation. Pulsed Amplitude Modulated (PAM) stress detection devices are also being used in deeper reefs to monitor stress levels.

Much of this imaging was produced using the SVII Camera. The SVII is a self-propelling underwater panoramic camera, and was designed by the survey team. The camera can be controlled by a diver, and is propelled at a constant speed. The Seaview SVII-S has also been designed, and is a lighter, human-propelled version of the SVII which can be transported by a single person. Underwater tablets are used to control the cameras and observe real-time images, and have also been used for communication, especially with social media.

As mentioned, ROUVs are used to sample deeper reefs. These are highly mobile, and can operate at low depths. These ROUVs also contain scientific equipment which can be altered depending on the sampling being carried out, and can carry out sampling. As with the low-depth cameras, these ROUVs are able to produce high definition geo-positioned images.

== Catlin Global Reef Record ==
Data from the Catlin Seaview Survey has been used to construct the Catlin Global Reef Record, which was launched in 2013. This database contains images and data collected by the Catlin Seaview Survey and by other coral reef research. However, the huge photographic records generated by the Catlin Seaview Survey are the main aspect of this record. The Catlin Global Reef Record is freely available to scientists globally, and can be used to analyse these reef environments and monitor their change.
