= Wreck Island =

Island in Queensland, Australia

- IUCN category Ia (strict nature reserve)
- Location within Queensland
- Location: Queensland
- Nearest city: Gladstone
- Coordinates: 23°20′S 151°57′E
- Area: 14 ha (35 acres)
- Governing body: Queensland Parks and Wildlife Service
- Website: Official website

Wreck Island is a small coral cay. It is located near the Tropic of Capricorn in the southern Great Barrier Reef, 93 km due north east of Gladstone, Queensland, Australia, and 460 km north of the state capital Brisbane.

The island is part of the Great Barrier Reef chain of islands, and is part of the Capricorn and Bunker Group of island and forms part of the Capricornia Cays National Park. It is also part of the Capricornia Cays Important Bird Area.

== General ==
Wreck Island is mainly formed from beach rock which is well developed along the southern beach. The island is situated on the south west end of a coral reef platform which is about 3.5 km by 1.5 km in size. The vegetation is similar to that on Tryon Island except that the Pisonia grandis forest is less well developed.

== Geomorphology and landscape ==
The Capricorn and Bunker Cays form part of a distinct geomorphic province at the southern end of the Great Barrier Reef. The cays and their reefs lie on the western marginal shelf, and are separated from the mainland by the Curtis Channel. The cays are not generally visible from the mainland, although Masthead Island may be viewed from Mount Larcom on a clear day.

Geologically the cays are young, having developed during the Holocene period; they are mostly around 5000 years old. The sea level was much lower during the last ice age (at the end of the Pleistocene period) and the coastal plain on which today's reefs and cays developed was completely exposed. Early in the Holocene (around 10,000 years ago) the sea level began to rise, until it stabilised at its present level around 6000 years ago. Once the sea level stabilised, it was possible for reef flats to expand and provide potential sites for the formation of cays.

Wreck Island is a shingle cay and part of a platform reef.

== History ==
=== Discovery ===
In 1803, Captain Eber Bunker of the whaling ship Albion was the first European to discover the region and gave his name to the southern group. Wreck Island itself was discovered at a similar date by Matthew Flinders when the ship he was in and one other sailed into it and were both wrecked. A third ship sailed on making no rescue attempt. Flinders, several officers and 12 sailors then rowed a small ship's boat down to Fraser Island and then down the coast to Sydney to summon help.

During a second whaling voyage from England in Albion, he discovered the Bunker Islands off the Queensland coast.

The southern cays and reefs were first chartered between 1819 and 1821 by Lieutenant Phillip Parker King RN initially in the Mermaid and later in the Bathurst. The main charting exercise for all the islands and reefs was carried out in 1843 under the command of Captain Francis Price Blackwood in HMS Fly which was accompanied by the Bramble. The naturalist, Professor J. Beete Jukes, was on board the Fly and his published journal provides valuable information on some of the cays.

=== Other uses ===
Wreck Island has been used for oil exploration and has a capped drill-hole dating from oil exploration activities which occurred over 30 years ago

There is also a derelict hut at Wreck Island from when the island was used as a private residence.

== Ecology ==
=== Natural ===
Green turtle rookeries are located at Wreck Island, West Fairfax Island, and West Hoskyn Islands; these are maintained in a natural condition, free from human disturbance.

Up to eight seabird species breed on Masthead Island, One Tree Island and Wreck Island, and seven species are recorded from Tryon Island, Erskine Island and West Fairfax Islands. The Capricorn silvereye, a small bird endemic to the southern Great Barrier Reef, is present.

White-bellied sea eagle Haliaeetus leucogaster breeds during the winter months on Wreck Island. While this species once nested on most of the cays of the Capricorn and Bunker Group but nest sites are now restricted to Tryon, North West, Wilson, Wreck, East Fairfax and West Hoskyn Islands.

=== Pests ===
A population of black rats Rattus rattus was eradicated from Wreck Island in the late 1980s

== Known shipwrecks on the reef ==
America a ship of 391 tons. The vessel was built Quebec, Canada, in 1827. Captain Robert Donal. The vessel America had taken convicts to Sydney in 1829 and to Hobart in 1831. En route from Sydney to Batavia, the vessel struck a reef near Bunker Island and was wrecked on 20 June 1831. The crew launched two boats and eventually reached Morton Bay. The whaling barque Nelson and the Caledonia were involved in salvage.

The Governor Philip, which arrived on Saturday last, from Moreton Bay and Port Macquarie, has brought up the crew of the ship America, bound from Hobart Town to Batavia, which was unfortunately wrecked on a coral reef, on the Northern Loo Islands. This disastrous occurrence took place about 1 o'clock in the morning of the 20th of June, when the vessel was running under three topsails and a foresail, in the midst of a black showery squall. All the sails were immediately clewed up and stowed, the stream anchor stocked, and every exertion made to endeavour to heave off, but without effect; particularly as the darkness of the night and the heavy sea, rendered it quite impossible to lower a boat. The ship, meanwhile, continued heavily beating on the reef, and in about an hour after she struck, began to fill very fast. At 3 o'clock, there was about four-feet-water in the hold, and all the rudder-bands, the rudder-trunk, and part of the counter had been carried away. At day light, it was found that the ship had bilged, as the fore-hold was nearly half full of water. With considerable difficulty the long-boat and pinnace were got out, together with some provisions and other necessaries with which the crew made for a small island, on the same reef, about two miles N.N. W. of the wreck, where they remained until the boats were rigged, when they set sail for Moreton Bay, which place they reached on the 27th of June.

The following are some interesting particulars of the proceedings of the crew, from the time the vessel struck up to their safe arrival at Moreton Bay:

Monday, June 20th Early this day the ship's company were employed in getting out the long- boat and pinnace, which they at length accomplished, and loaded them with a few casks of provisions and water, and all the people's clothes. About 11 o'clock a. m. they left the ship and made for a small island about two miles off, and landed, after tome difficulty, on the reef, and the. crew employed themselves in carrying the light goods to the island, until high-water, when the long-boat und pinnace were safely discharged. The long-boat was anchored outside the reef, and the pinnnce hauled upon the beach. At high-water the reef is quite covered, but is dry at low-water. A tent was erected on the island, and the dry goods placed under it. The people caught a turtle this evening.

21st.-The pinnace was manned and proceeded to the wreck, out of which various goods were taken. A party was also sent in search of water, and to ascertain what the island produced. Not the least sign of water, nor a single fruit, of any kind, were found. The reef was covered with turtle, and the island abounded with birds, consisting, principally, of doves, magpies and sea fowl. This "day the people shifted their tent to a more convenient spot among some trees, and. Under all the circumstances, made a tolerably comfortable abitation. Weather hot and sultry. Lat."23 44'.

22d.-The pinnace and her crew were again dispatched to the wreck, and brought off various articles. A party also walked across the reef, to a dry part of which a rope was passed from the wreck, and by this means a great deal of property was saved. The labour, however, was excessive, owing, particularly, to the difficulty of walking on the reef, as the coral gave way almost at every step. The people's feet were dreadfully cut. A turtle was caught to-day, weighing: nearly 4 cwt. Crew all in good heath, and excellent spirits.

23d.-Every thing of any use had been removed by this time, and the long-boat made ready for sea. The water began to get very low, without any prospect of obtaining a further supply. All the boats were got ready, and the people determined to make for Moreton Bay.

24th to 30t/i.-Ready for sea, but waiting for a fair wind.

July 1st to 6th.-Wind still foul.

7th.-Early this morning the people put to sea with a fair wind at N.W. The day was remarkably fine, with a steady breeze throughout.

8th.-The weather very unfavourable; sea running high, with a fresh breeze. A quantity of provisions, and other stores, had been thrown overboard, from the long boat, to keep her from swamping. In the course of the night of the 7th, the boats passed an island, for which they this day bore up, and towards night, got under its lee.

9th.-The crew landed; took out all the boats cargo, and set to work to make them more sea-worthy. The main land of New South Wales was discernable from this island, on which the people remained till the 16th, when they were obliged to leave for want of water.

16th:-Sailed, and on the following morning the boats were under the main land. Nothing particular occurred this day (17th) or night, during the whole of which the boats sailed under the land.

18th-About 12 o'clock p. m. the people went ashore on an island close to the main, where they fortunately found water, and having taken in a supply proceeded on their voyage.

The weather was in general fine from this time up to the 27th, when the shipwrecked mariners reached Moreton Bay in safety, where they were most kindly received, and every assistance afforded them by the Commandant, of whose gentlemanly and humane conduct the sailors are loud in praise.

This is the vessel (or the wreck) that gave the island its name during the main charting exercise for all the islands and reefs in this area carried out in 1843 under the command of Captain Francis Price Blackwood in HMS Fly which was accompanied by the Bramble.

In 1841, Blackwood was appointed to command the corvette HMS Fly in the first hydrographic survey commissioned by the Admiralty for exploring and charting the north-east Australian coast. The Fly, fitted with costly instruments, and carrying two scientists, Joseph Jukes, geologist, and John MacGillivray, zoologist, sailed from Falmouth in April 1842 with the cutter Bramble, under the charge of Lieutenant Charles Bampfield Yule. After a stop in Hobart Town from August to October, the two ships called at Sydney and began the survey in December 1842.

In the next three years the Fly charted from Sandy Cape to Whitsunday Island, including Swain Reefs and Capricorn Islands and the broad passages between. On 7 January 1843 was the first time that the crew of the Fly set foot on the First Bunker Island (Lady Elliot Island)

Jan 18 – Landed with Captain Blackwood on Wreck Island. This was so named for part of a vessel 6 or 700 tons. The island was about a quarter of a mile long and not more than 100 yards broad; a pile of sand covered by thick bushes.

Jan 21 Captain Blackwood and Mr Evans being ashore to "take sights" for the chronometers, found on the island some traces of the wrecked crew. On one tree was cut "The America, June 1831"; on another "Mary Ann Broughton"; on another "Capt. E. David"; and "Nelson November, 1831". There were likewise the soles of a pair of child's shoes, some bottles, some broken dishes, and an old cask. I believe the wreck was that of a whaler, and that the crew were taken off by another whaler, as there were no signs of either graves or bones.

== See also ==
- Capricorn and Bunker Group
- Great Barrier Reef
- Capricornia Cays National Park
