= Lady Musgrave Island =

Coral cay on Australia's Great Barrier Reef

- IUCN category II (national park)
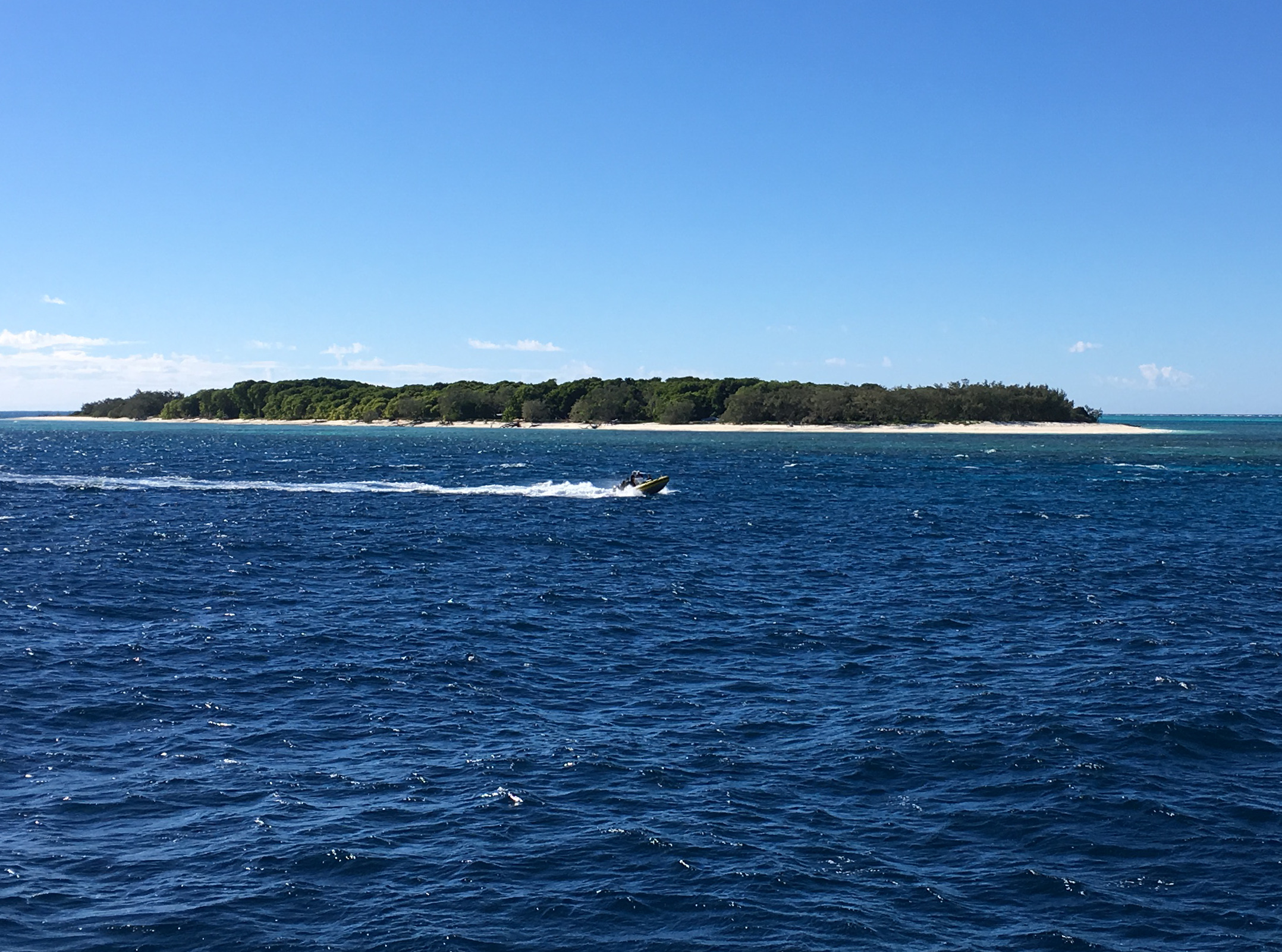

- Location within Queensland
- Location: Queensland
- Nearest city: Gladstone
- Coordinates: 23°54′30″S 152°23′39″E
- Area: 0.275 km^{2} (0.106 sq mi)
- Governing body: Queensland Parks and Wildlife Service
- Website: Official website

Lady Musgrave Island is a 14 hectares (35 acres) coral cay on Australia's Great Barrier Reef, with a 1,192 hectares (2,950 acres) surrounding reef. The island is the second southernmost island in the Great Barrier Reef chain of islands, the first (southernmost) being Lady Elliot Island. The Island is named after Lady Lucinda Musgrave, the wife of Sir Anthony Musgrave, a colonial governor of Queensland.

Lady Musgrave Island, and the immediate surrounds, is a national park and can be reached by excursion boat from Bundaberg (located approximately 4 hours north of Brisbane) and from the Town of 1770, Queensland (located approximately 5 hours north of Brisbane). The island is part of the Capricornia Cays Important Bird Area.

Lady Musgrave Island is referred to as Wallaginji by local Australian Aboriginal tribes. The name Wallaginji means 'beautiful reef'.

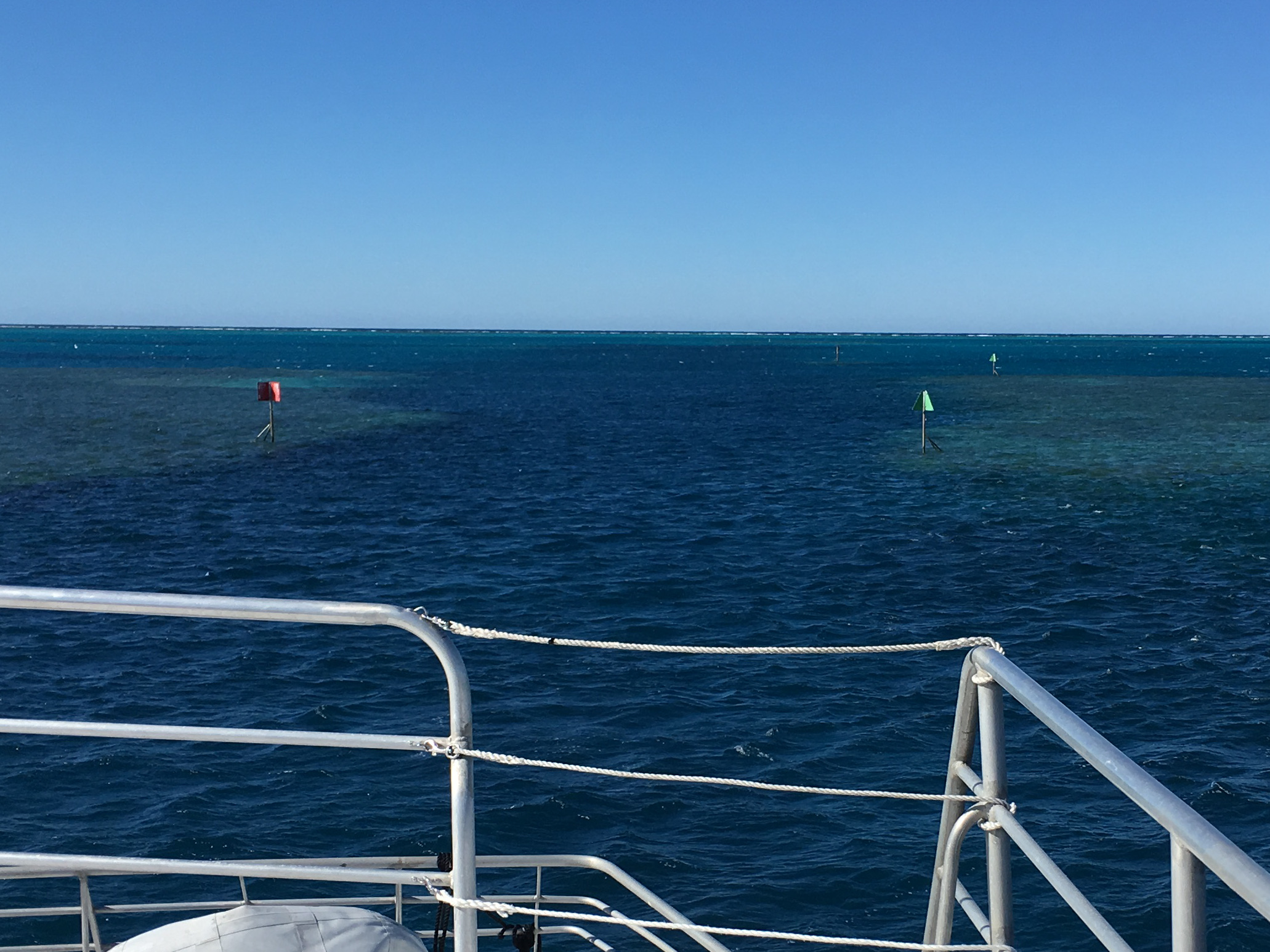
Entrance to the lagoon at Lady Musgrave island

== Geography ==
This island is the only shingle cay situated on the leeward reef flat. The island also has beach rock that is exposed along the north eastern and eastern beaches and an outcrop of lithified coral conglomerate, similar to that forming the core of the cay, occurs near the south eastern corner.

Vegetation consists of Pisonia grandis, Tournefortia argentea, Casuarina equisetifolia, and Pandanus tectorius. The vegetation is less dense than that of the larger sand cays of the Capricorn Group.

A small pond of brackish water is located towards the southern end of the cay. The island is located on the southern end of a large lagoon. From a boating perspective, a good thing about Lady Musgrave reef is that one can enter the lagoon via a deep water channel. There has been some debate about whether the channel into the lagoon is a naturally occurring phenomenon, or was cut into the lagoon by Japanese or Taiwanese fishermen, or, as legend has it, it was widened by guano miners many years ago; it is recorded by 1938 and in 1966 surveys.

More convincingly however, the channel is mentioned in William Collin's Life & Adventures of an Essexman: a Queensland pioneer and in a Brisbane newspaper reporting in December 1875 Collin's salvage of the Norseman. It may have been widened by Captain Collin after he had re-floated the Norseman from Lady Musgrave Island reef and repaired damage to its hull; apparently Collin's crew had the vessel 'on the hard' on the sand cay to make these repairs. He may have widened the narrow, naturally occurring 'gap' in the reef to get the repaired vessel out of the lagoon, under tow and without further mishap.

=== Tourism ===
Lady Musgrave Lighthouse

Lady Musgrave Island is serviced by two operators offering day trips - Lady Musgrave Experience from Bundaberg and 1770Reef from the Town of 1770. In mid-2020, a pontoon will be launched by Lady Musgrave Experience for the use of day visitors and overnight guests.

Lady Musgrave Island is the most intensively used of the camping islands within the Capricorn Bunker group, due to its protected anchorage within a semi-enclosed lagoon and daily transfers.

It is recognised that the permitted numbers of visitors on Lady Musgrave Island at this time, have reached (and at times exceeded) an ecologically sustainable level.

A lease for navigation purposes exists on Lady Musgrave Island with a lighthouse was constructed on Lady Musgrave Island in April 1974. The light is controlled and maintained by the Australian Maritime Safety Authority with inspections of the light are undertaken by helicopter, and an area of the lease is set aside for landing purposes. The facility is maintained using an amphibious vehicle launched from a maintenance vessel.

Much of this area comes under the Capricornia Cays National Park with current usages including camping, permitted on four cays up to the following limits:

- North West Island 150 campers
- Lady Musgrave Island 40 campers
- Masthead Island 60 campers (30 from October to March)
- Tryon Island 30 campers. (Currently closed.)

The island has no fresh water supply, so visitors need to bring all fresh drinking water. A composting toilet is available on the island. The area also has many visits by both passing vessels cruising the Queensland coast and day trippers in fast jet catamarans (typically Lady Musgrave Island). The area is also of significances as a fishery particularly for king prawns.

== History ==
=== Discovery ===
In 1803 Captain Eber Bunker of the whaling ship Albion was the first European to discover the region. He gave his name to the southern group.

The southern cays and reefs were first charted between 1819 and 1821 by Lieutenant Phillip Parker King Royal Navy, initially in the Mermaid and later in the Bathurst. The main charting exercise for all the islands and reefs was carried out in 1843 under the command of Captain Francis Price Blackwood in HMS Fly which was accompanied by the Bramble. The naturalist, Professor J. Beete Jukes, was on board the Fly and his published journal provides valuable information on some of the cays.

=== Guano mining in the 1890s ===
The mining of guano (bird droppings) occurred on Lady Musgrave Island, Fairfax Islands and North West Island during the 1890s. This was an extension of a more substantial guano mining operation on Lady Elliot Island to the south where guano mining had started in the early 1860s. Some remains of these activities are still evident.

Lady Elliot Island was the first to be mined in 1863. They took about one metre off the island. The next to be mined was the next island in the chain, Lady Musgrave Island. Although they knew the name, the guano miners called the place Bunker number 1 – Fairfax Islands were known as Bunker number 2. Fairfax was more heavily mined before the miners moved onto North West Island.

An extract from the original miners helps paint the picture of the operations on Lady Musgrave "We had a good run across, and pitched camp a short distance above the crown of the beach, the cutter anchoring in the capacious lagoon. This has the important distinction of having a narrow deep-water entrance, enabling small vessels to enter or leave at any time of the tide. Being narrow it is somewhat difficult to locate. A permanent beacon at each end of the channel would be very useful" ....... On Lady Musgrave "The phosphate-guano deposits proved very meagre. Taking the whale boat we then sailed down to Fairfax Island (Bunker No.2), only: four or five miles distant. Fairfax Island was a difficult place to work, particularly as to the shipping; tide work was necessary and a launch was used for the long tow out to the anchorage. Operations on a minor scale were carried on at Lady Musgrave at the same time, a ketch being employed to lighter cargoes across to the sailing vessels loading at the other island. It was out of the question to use steamers in the trade, the rate of loading being much too low".

=== Tourist resort in the 1930s ===
A concrete slab is the only remnant of a resort which operated at Lady Musgrave Island during the 1930s. The island had been a hub for a number of pleasure cruises when eventually more extensive construction of tourist facilities occurred in 1938 and 1939 at Lady Musgrave Island, including six cottages and other facilities. The caretakers were Mr & Mrs Bell and they "discourage the removal of marine growth in every way and to assist in this object specimens of the reef life are not even collected for display purposes at the settlement". At around this period the Sapphire (photo of the Sapphire) was being used to regularly take tourists from Bundaberg to Lady Musgrave Island. The vessel was owned and operated by Eric Keppel Hansen (he preferred to be called Keppel).

=== Military target practice at Fairfax Islands, 1943 ===
East and West Fairfax Islands were used as a bombing range by the Royal Australian Air Force and Royal Australian Navy from the 1940 through to the 1960s. It is likely that during World War II Lady Musgrave reef was also used for bombing practice "with the reef now practically a marine desert" as reported in 1952.

=== TNT Alltrans grounding on 25 March 1985 ===
At about 03:40 on 25 March 1985 the Australian registered ship TNT Alltrans grounded on Lady Musgrave Island, while on a voyage from Gladstone, Queensland to the port of Bluff, New Zealand.

The ship become hard fast on the reef in a position with the island's light bearing 075 degrees true distant about 0.35 miles (600 m); that the ship's engines continued to run ahead until about 04:00 hours when they were stopped.

The ship suffered extensive bottom damage in the incident. There was no loss of life or injury to persons and no pollution of the marine environment attributable to the incident. The ship was refloated with the aid of a tug on 26 March 1985 and anchored off the island until 29 March for divers' inspection of the damage and temporary repairs. The ship then proceeded under its own power at reduced speed to Newcastle, New South Wales for assessment of the damage and, subsequently, permanent repairs.

That the grounding was directly caused by the failure of the officer of the watch to control the navigation of the ship over an extended period.

The TNT Alltrans is a diesel engined bulk carrier of 35,218 tonnes deadweight, built in 1983. It carries alumina in bulk, The ship is fitted with cargo-handling equipment which enables it to discharge its own cargoes and has been employed continuously since commissioning in the carriage of alumina from Gladstone to Bluff, and from Bunbury, Western Australia to Bell Bay, Tasmania.

== Ecology ==
=== Environmental aspects ===
Pisonia (Pisonia grandis) trees are the primary vegetation, with she-oaks and Pandanus tectorius trees forming most of the remaining percentage.

Camping is allowed for up to 40 people at a time, with some restrictions (e.g.: no open fires), and must be booked. Camping can be booked up to 11 months in advance and is recommended that you do so, especially during school holidays. The island is closed to all campers in the months of February and March to protect turtle hatchlings. More information can be found at https://web.archive.org/web/20061002052638/https://www.epa.qld.gov.au/parks/iaparks/gds/IAGDS030.do#Lady%20Musgrave%20Island%20campground. Camping permits can be obtained for a small fee online. Campers can bring their own dive compressors (can only be run from 9 am to 6 pm). Generators are NOT allowed.

The daily (subject to weather) tourist boat from 1770 can resupply campers with prearranged supplies.

As the island is well outside the light cone of coastal cities, the stargazing is spectacular, with nightly meteor showers not uncommon.

The extreme edges of the coral lagoon should generally be avoided during tidal inflow and outflow, as the pull can be quite strong. There is an old legend involving a legless man and a widow who died there. It is rumoured to be haunted by their ghosts.

=== Wildlife ===
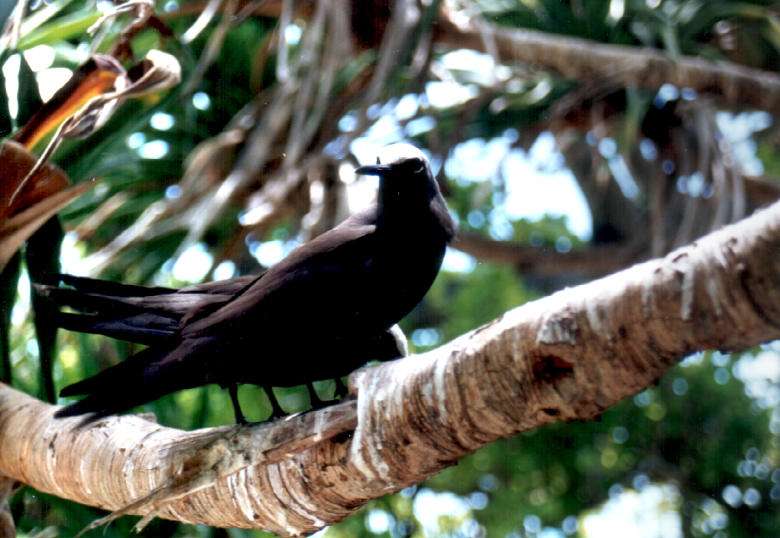
Noddy terns

There are an enormous number of birds on the island. white-capped noddy terns nest in abundance in the Pisonia trees whilst bridled terns, black-naped terns and silver gulls nest on the ground in more open areas nearer the beach. The carcasses of noddy tern chicks that fall out of nests or adults that become tangled in the sticky Pisonia seeds are quickly devoured by centipedes and the nutrients eventually returned to the soil. From December to May, migratory wedge-tailed shearwaters, colloquially known as 'mutton birds', nest in burrows in the interior of the island and their mournful wails can be heard at night. These birds are readily seen along the forest walk at night and precaution must be taken to not stray from the path as the burrows easily collapse under the weight of a person. From September to March, migratory shorebirds such as ruddy turnstone, grey-tailed tattler, wandering tattler, bar-tailed godwit, Pacific golden plover and lesser sand plover can be seen foraging on the reef flat at low tide. Buff-banded rails, white and grey phases of the eastern reef egret, pied oystercatchers, sooty oystercatchers and Capricorn silvereyes are resident on the island year-round.

The island is a nesting place for green and loggerhead turtles, and there is usually a turtle-research representative camping on the island during nesting and hatching times.

Small whitetip reef sharks and leopard sharks can often be found hunting in the shallows around the island. These species are not dangerous to humans, and are fascinating to watch.

Green and loggerhead turtles can be spotted resting on coral bommies, and the coral lagoon is a haven for a multitude of fish and coral species.

=== Pests ===
==== Goats ====
Goats were originally introduced around the end of the 19th century by the early survey vessel mariners and the early guano vessels and whalers (and the guano vessels and whalers tended to be the same vessels) as they left goats in a number of locations, and coconut trees, for they believed that if people got shipwrecked, they had a goat to eat and they had a coconut to provide them with some sort of a liquid.

Over a period of time the vegetation suffered and damage was caused on the island from over-grazing by goats, as on many islands in the Great Barrier Reef.

In particular, the destruction of vegetation at Lady Musgrave Island has been documented since 1928, when Napier provided the following account:

The undergrowth has been completely eaten away by a flock of goats which have inhabited the place for years, whereas every other island that we saw was clad so thickly in its green and tangled robe of grass and weed and low-hung twisted branches that the crossing of it was a long and hot and complicated task. [...] All the undergrowth has long since gone; hardly a weed can be found from one end of the place to the other; every branch has been denuded of its leaves, and even the bark upon the trees has been gnawed away to the height of several feet

This account was corroborated by another, written in 1936 by the Queensland Acting Director of Forests, who stated that at Lady Musgrave and nearby islands the presence of large herds of goats was threatening both the 'scenic charm' of the islands and the native island wildlife; he stated that grazing by goats resulted in the 'destruction of the grass, herbaceous and shrubby vegetation on the islands [and the] diminution of the normal food for land birds and other Australian animals.

Also in 1936, the destruction of vegetation at Lady Musgrave Island and other islands of the Capricorn-Bunker Group was described by NP Ranger G. Geoffrey, who reported the presence of 'about 20 head of goats' at Lady Musgrave Island, herds of goats in the Bunker Group, and about '150 head of goats' at North Fairfax Island, which were reported to be in very poor condition as a result of lack of food and were eating the roots of Pisonia trees to survive.

By 1947, the destruction of the island vegetation by goats was still occurring. Mr Marshall, the Queensland Ichthyologist, stated that 'at present the above island has become overrun with goats. They have eaten the island bare of grass and are now destroying trees.' In 1948, an early attempt to eradicate goats from Lady Musgrave Island was made and a NP Ranger reported that all goats on that island were removed and destroyed, although goats were subsequently re-introduced.

Further damage was documented at Lady Musgrave Island during the 1960s, including others impact besides the destruction of vegetation. In 1964, although the goat population had declined to around 18 animals, many ticks were found at the island.

While still unsatisfactory because of the destruction of vegetation it was still an improvement since the almost complete destruction of the vegetation, in 1927, by around 200–300 goats.

One reason why the eradication of goats was difficult to accomplish was the deliberate transfer of some animals between islands, as Julie Booth, a naturalist resident on Fairfax Island, reported in 1969. She stated: 'there have been a large number of campers at Lady Musgrave who visited Fairfax [...]. [They] brought two goats over from the other island, which they were going to leave here.'

Goat were eradicated 1974 on Lady Musgrave with approximately 300 removed by hunting.

Vegetation has recovered since 1974.

==== African guinea fowls ====
African Guinea fowls that were released at Lady Musgrave Island in 1974. These were present in the 1980s but unsure if they are still present on the island.

==== Locusts or other insects ====
Occasional invasions by locusts or other insects blown from the mainland have caused severe defoliation of Pisonia as on Lady Musgrave in 1925. This has occurred on other nearby islands recently.

== Known shipwrecks on the reef ==
Jane Lockhart sunk between 11 and 17 December 1868 on Lady Musgrave Island / Heron Island / Masthead Reef or One Tree Island The vessel was a 2-masted schooner. Departed from Sydney with general cargo for Broadsound; and ran aground on Lady Musgrave Is; maybe on Heron Is or One Tree Island or Masthead Reef Lost on a reef off Heron Island on the night of 17 December 1868. The crew took to the boat and safely reached the pilot station at Keppel Island.
The vessel was originally stated as having hit at Lady Musgrave reef (most unlikely) later news reports claim wreck on Heron Island with some other reports mention the wreck on either One Tree Island or Mast Head. The vessel was built in 1861 at Ulladulla New South Wales and registered in Sydney with the Official number of 36858 and a Registered number of 9/1861 with a gross tonnage of 80 tons and 82 feet in length.
From the original reports

One of the boats dispatched to the wreck of the Jane Lockhart, schooner, has returned with the sails and a portion of the running and standing gear. The vessel, it appears, did not strike on Bunker's Group, as reported by Captain Machen, but upon what is known as Heron Island, about ninety miles to the northward of Bunker's Group. When the boat reached the vessel she was settled in a hollow in one of the reefs, the outer formation of the hollow acting as a breakwater against the seas. One side of the vessel was quite visible, and the new copper sheathing appeared uninjured. Captain Norris, who went down in charge of the boat, unbent the sails, so that the position of the vessel might as much as possible remain unaltered; he left the yards and masts standing.

and 6 months later it was reported as

The Rose, schooner, has returned from the wreck of the Jane Lockhart, on Masthead Reef, whither she went on June 15 Captain Dwyer informs us that the Jane Lockhart still lies in a very snug position, and he has no doubt but that himself, and Mr Norris, the purchaser of the wreck, will be able, ultimately, to raise the vessel and bring her safely to Rockhampton

Nearly the whole of the period that they were at the reef, very heavy weather prevailed, staving operations towards the recovery of the cargo, but luckily the strong SE winds lulled for about three days Captain Dwyer availed himself of the occasion, set to work, rigged up a staging between the masts of the Lockhart, schooner, and by means of a rope and a South Sea Island diver, managed to bring up from eighty to ninety large iron pulley wheels, besides a quantity of machinery and sundries, comprising Ale, porter, liqueur brandy, cutlery, ironmongery, etc Unfortunately the Roses water ran out, much to the chagrin of the crew, who would have raised a great deal more, only having to run into port for supplies

Norseman In February 1875 the Norseman struck the reef and a few months later a salvage attempt was made. On 27th May 1875 Thomas Gallienne went back to the Norseman to retrieve some pumps and salvage equipment. While entering the passage their rowboat capsized and the party had to swim to shore. Thomas Gallienne was taken by a shark, later caught by the crew who cut it open and recovered his head and body parts. His gold earrings were sent back to his widow and his brother in Liverpool, England. His body and remains were buried on the island.

Bannockburn An 85 feet long, 110 ton, Brigantine built at Mechanic's Bay, Auckland in 1880 on 9 November 1884 struck no.1 Bunker Island and was refloated after cargo (timber) salvaged, taken to Rockhampton. Eventually became a total loss due wrecking in Fitzroy River 1905.

Kokotu Motor Vessel Struck a reef off Lady Musgrave Island during cyclone Emily, 1 April 1972.

A Maule M-7 seaplane (registration VH-JLU) carrying passengers from Lady Musgrave Island crashed during take-off on Monday 5 January 1998 with the occupants sustaining only minor injuries. The aircraft was destroyed.

A fishing trawler on or around Christmas 1990/91 also caught fire and sank in North East corner of lagoon.

== See also ==
- Capricorn and Bunker Group
- Great Barrier Reef
- Capricornia Cays National Park
