= Fairfax Islands =

Island group in Queensland, Australia

- Location within Queensland
- Location: Queensland
- Nearest city: Gladstone
- Coordinates: 23°51′32″S 152°22′13″E
- Area: 50 ha (120 acres)
- Governing body: Queensland Parks and Wildlife Service
- Website: Official website

Fairfax Islands is a pair of small coral cays, both of which have been used as a bombing range. They are located near the Tropic of Capricorn in the southern Great Barrier Reef, 113 kilometres (70 mi) due east of Gladstone, Queensland, Australia, and 405 km (252 mi) north of the state capital Brisbane.

The island is the third island in the Great Barrier Reef chain of islands (with the first being Lady Elliot Island), and is part of the Capricorn and Bunker Group of islands and forms part of the Capricornia Cays National Park as well as of the Capricornia Cays Important Bird Area. Most people only see the island by the more easily reached Lady Musgrave Island, which can be readily reached by fast catamaran from Bundaberg (4 hours north of Brisbane), the town of 1770, Queensland, or from Gladstone, both of which are located approximately five hours drive north of Brisbane.

Fairfax Islands

- East Fairfax 23°51′18″S 152°22′38″E
- West Fairfax23°51′43″S 152°22′2″E

== Geomorphology and landscape ==
The eastern cay is composed of shingle and the western of sand and shingle. Interference with the vegetation of the eastern cay occurred as a result of phosphate mining and secondly during the period when the Australian Military Forces used the area as a bombing target. The cay is no longer used for either purposes. Vegetation is dominated by Pisonia grandis which is restricted to the centre of the island. Two brackish pools are located towards the eastern end of the island.

The western cay features an elongated sand spit that supports vegetation on its western extremity. Vegetation is similar to that occurring on the larger sand cays of the Capricorn Group. A tin shed, erected by the Australian Navy when the eastern cay was used for bombing practice, is located in the centre of the island.

The Capricorn and Bunker Cays form part of a distinct geomorphic province at the southern end of the Great Barrier Reef (Hopley 1982). The cays and their reefs lie on the western marginal shelf, and are separated from the mainland by the Curtis Channel. The cays are not generally visible from the mainland, although Masthead Island may be viewed from Mount Larcom on a clear day.

Geologically the cays are young, having developed during the Holocene period, they are mostly around 5,000 years old. The sea level was much lower during the last Ice Age (at the end of the Pleistocene period) and the coastal plain on which today's reefs and cays developed was completely exposed. Early in the Holocene (around 10,000 years ago) the sea level began to rise, until it stabilised at its present level around 6,000 years ago. Once the sea level stabilised, it was possible for reef flats to expand and provide potential sites for the formation of cays.

Fairfax Islands area a Closed Ring Reefs and the two coral cays belong to two distinct types:

- 1. Vegetated sand cays:- Fairfax (West).
- 2. Shingle cays:- Fairfax (East).

== History ==
=== Discovery ===
In 1803 Captain Eber Bunker of the whaling ship Albion 1798 whaler (2) was the first European to discover the region and gave his name to the southern group.

During a second whaling voyage from England in Albion he discovered the Bunker Islands off the Queensland coast.

Albion was 362 tons and registered in London, the ship was fitted with 10 guns, and had a crew of 26; she was built in Deptford, Britain, and owned by, Messrs. Champion; and used for general cargo.

The southern cays and reefs were first chartered between 1819 and 1821 by Royal Navy Lieutenant Phillip Parker King initially aboard Mermaid and later in Bathurst. The main charting exercise for all the islands and reefs was carried out in 1843 under the command of Captain Francis Blackwood in HMS Fly which was accompanied by HMS Bramble. The naturalist, Professor J. Beete Jukes, was on board Fly and his published journal provides valuable information on some of the cays.

=== Mining of guano in the 1890s ===
The mining of guano (bird droppings) occurred on Lady Musgrave Island, Fairfax and North West Island during the 1890s. This was an extension of a more substantial guano mining operation on Lady Elliot Island to the south. Some remains of these activities are still evident.

An 1899 article from The Brisbane Courier details the operation:

"The Pacific Islands Company, having worked cut the guano deposits at Fairfax Island, Bunker Group, is now transferring their plant to North-west Island In the Capricorn Group, which will be "the head- quarters for some time to" come (says the "Bundaberg Star" of yesterday). The steamer Lady Musgrave, which was chartered by the company for this work, returned to Bundaberg on Sunday afternoon, bringing Mr. A. E. Ellis, the local manager, and account forty Japanese, whose services are being dispensed with. The captain of the Lady Musgrave reports that he had helped to complete the work of removal from Fairfax to North-east Island. In about ten days, but, owing to the bad weather experienced, it occupied sixteen days to get through with It. So bad was the weather, that in fourteen days the vessel was only able to Steam for fifty hours, the steamer having to take shelter behind one of the islands from the heavy squalls and rain. The Lady Musgrave left Fairfax Island at 4 p.m. on Saturday, with the ketch Loma Doone in tow. Heavy weather was encountered, and at 3 p.m. on Sunday the line parted, and notwithstanding all the efforts made, it proved impossible to pick up the ketch again, and it was decided to make for Burnett Heads, which were not reached, as stated, till 4 p.m. the same day. The Loma Doone apparently got through all right, for she was reported off Bustard Head on Sunday, and is expected to arrive here tomorrow."

=== Grave of Joseph Perry Callaghan ===
The islands contain the grave of Joseph Perry Callaghan who was aged 24 and died at the island on the 10th of June, 1898. Callaghan was engaged in the collection of guano for the Pacific Islands Company.

=== Military target practice at Fairfax Islands, 1943–1965 ===
East and West Fairfax Islands were used as a bombing range by the Royal Australian Air Force and Royal Australian Navy. This ceased over 40 years ago, and the vegetation of these two cays has largely recovered. Bomb disposal experts have found and destroyed unexploded ordnance left from the bombing, however advice from the Australian Army suggests that much more unexploded ordnance may still remain on the Island.

The islands have physically changed, with old craters visible on the eastern side of East Fairfax.

Changes have occurred in the morphology, vegetation and seabird populations of Fairfax Island as a result of military bombing practice. During and after the Second World War, the Fairfax Islands (particularly East Fairfax Island) suffered environmental degradation from such practice. One report by a national park ranger, describing the condition of the island before the Second World War, stated that:

"One section of Fairfax Island was thickly timbered with Pisonia umbellifera, Pandanus pedunculatus, and Casuarina (Oak); ... bird life is very plentiful on this island and during the time of his visit the Brown Gannet were nesting there in thousands; and... the island is also the nesting place of the Mutton bird during the nesting season."

Yet when the Queensland government ichthyologist, Mr T. C. Marshall, visited Fairfax Island shortly after 1945, he commented that the gannet rookery there "was not one tenth its pre-war size when you could hardly move among the thousands of nests without stepping upon one of them", and he attributed the decline of the bird population to naval bombing practices during the war.

Another report in 1953 by C. Roff, described the effects of bombing practice at Fairfax Island as having "Large [breeding] numbers of the brown gannet" (Sula leucogaster). They were described as "[continuing] to sit on nests whilst aircraft roar overhead and rockets explode".

A report from Mr. D. Jolly in April 1954, contained the following description:

"As the result of the bombing and shelling of the National Park by the Navy, there are some large shell craters at the eastern portion of the island in which an elephant could be buried. Fortunately this area is tree less. On the western portion of the west island are some bomb craters near and among the trees. After the attack on the island by the Navy the trees were almost stripped of leaves."

== Ecology ==
=== Natural ===
Green turtle rookeries are located at Wreck Island, West Fairfax and West Hoskyn Islands these are maintained in a natural condition, free from human disturbance;

There are also brown booby breeding colonies at East and West Fairfax and East Hoskyn Islands

=== Pests ===
The island have had a reasonable long exposure to introduced pests firstly goats were introduced to the island in the guano mining period; these were later eradicated from East and West Fairfax Islands in the early 1970s.

Until recently, East and West Fairfax Islands were also infested with two species of rats (black rats), and they were reportedly responsible for significant destruction of the seabird population, the island had also been infested and by cockroaches, but the rats have probably been eradicated through a recent National parks baiting program.

Locusts completely stripped the Pisonia foliage on west Fairfax Island in 1986 allowing sunlight to penetrate to the forest floor. An impenetrable metre-high thicket of Wollastonia biflora (Asteraceae) and other species rapidly developed but eight months later the canopy had regrown, the forest floor was again in shade and the undergrowth thicket was dead.

== Known shipwrecks on the reef ==
Diana, a wooden carvel schooner / brig of 103 tons and 70 feet (21 m) in length built in Sydney in 1847 by the builder Ale and owned by C.L. Throck. The vessel ran aground on 1 June 1864 in the Bunker Group at the North Western side of "middle island" (she was wrecked on Fairfax Island (middle island - Bunker group)) while loading guano

Diana was a vessel engaged in guano mining. Boomerang sighted the wreckage on the northwestern side of "middle Bunker Island" on 13 August 1864, and the crew went ashore and found part of the wreck had been salvaged with equipment and tents hauled onto one of the islands. The wreck had broken into two parts, with many timbers strewn about on the reef salvaged, but no sign of life. The crew had been rescued by the schooner Caroline (also reported by press as Eleanor Palmer).

== See also ==
- Capricorn and Bunker Group
- Great Barrier Reef
- Capricornia Cays National Park
