= Tryon Island =

Island in Queensland, Australia

- IUCN category II (national park)
- Location within Queensland
- Location: Queensland
- Nearest city: Gladstone
- Coordinates: 23°14′50″S 151°46′43″E
- Area: 21 ha (52 acres)
- Governing body: Queensland Parks and Wildlife Service
- Website: Official website

Tryon Island is a coral cay located in the southern Great Barrier Reef, 86 km northeast of Gladstone, Queensland, Australia, and 465 km north of the state capital Brisbane. The island is a protected area and forms part of Capricornia Cays National Park. It is part of the Capricornia Cays Important Bird Area. The cay covers an area of 0.21 square kilometres (0 square miles) and is surrounded by a coral reef that is partially exposed at low-tide.

== Geomorphology and landscape ==
On Tryon Island, there is beach rock along the north western and south eastern beaches. The cay has in the past been covered with dense vegetation.

The Capricorn and Bunker Cays form part of a distinct geomorphic province at the southern end of the Great Barrier Reef. The cays and their reefs lie on the western marginal shelf, and are separated from the mainland by the Curtis Channel. The cays are not generally visible from the mainland, although Masthead Island may be viewed from Mount Larcom on a clear day.

Geologically, the cays are young, having developed during the Holocene period, they are mostly around 5000 years old. The sea level was much lower during the last ice age (at the end of the Pleistocene period) and the coastal plain on which today's reefs and cays developed was completely exposed. Early in the Holocene (around 10,000 years ago), the sea level began to rise until it stabilised at its present level around 6000 years ago. Once the sea level stabilised, it was possible for reef flats to expand and provide potential sites for the formation of cays.

Tryon Island is a vegetated sand cay placed atop of a platform reef.

== History ==
=== Discovery ===
In 1799, the new ship Albion, owned by Messrs Champion, spent the two winters whaling, first off the Australian and then the New Zealand coasts. In 1803 Captain Eber Bunker of the whaling ship Albion was the first European to discover the region and gave his name to the southern group.

During a second whaling voyage from England in Albion, he discovered the Bunker Islands off the Queensland coast.

The southern cays and reefs were first chartered between 1819 and 1821 by Lieutenant Phillip Parker King RN initially in the Mermaid and later in the Bathurst. The main charting exercise for all the islands and reefs was carried out in 1843 under the command of Captain Francis Blackwood in HMS Fly, which was accompanied by the Bramble. The naturalist, Professor J. Beete Jukes, was on board the Fly and his published journal provides valuable information on some of the cays.

=== Guano Mining 1890–1900s ===
Tryon Island was probably mined for guano from 1898 to 1900, but it has been suggested that those operations must have been small, since few indications of mining remain in the landscape compared with some of the other islands within the group Fairfax Islands, Lady Elliot Island and North West Island.

=== Shell and coral collecting during the 1960s ===
In the 1963–1969, the eastern portion of the reef surrounding Tryon Island was used for coral collecting on a lease by Joyce Burnett & Sirian Hamilton Harlow. In 1968 Harold Frederick Manning was also given a lease for the below low water mark on the northwestern corner of Tryon reef.

=== Tryon Island anti-influenza drugs 1969 ===
At the end of 1969, Graeme Laver, Professor of Biochemistry and Molecular Biology at the Australian National University in Canberra, organised a trip to Tryon Island and discovered that seabirds on the Great Barrier Reef are riddled with influenza viruses. He collected sera from 201 shearwaters, tested them on the spot, and to his surprise, he discovered some birds had antibodies against antigens of Influenzavirus A and some of these avian antibodies are inhibitory to specific viral neuraminidases. Live viruses were also harvested from these birds on Tryon Island and a novel N9 neuraminidase was identified. Crystals of this neuraminidase were later prepared for X-ray diffraction analysis to elucidate the enzyme's three-dimensional structure, yielding information useful to many pharmaceuticals, such as Gilead Sciences, Hoffmann La Roche, BioCryst Pharmaceuticals, GlaxoWellcome, Eli Lilly and Company, Abbott Labs., ZymeTx Corporation and Pfizer Ltd. in the design and synthesis of novel neuraminidase inhibitors which these companies hoped to market as anti-influenza drugs. In particular, Gilead Sciences in the United States developed a carbocyclic, orally bioavailable neuraminidase inhibitor currently marketed under the name Tamiflu.

=== Scale insect outbreak 1993 ===
In August 1993, shortly before Tryon Island was incorporated into the Capricornia Cays National Park in 1994, an outbreak of the scale insect Pulvinaria urbicola was detected on the island's pisonia forest. At this time, Tryon's pisonia covered nearly half the island.

This was the first known scale outbreak in a pisonia forest of the Capricornia Cays, and one of the world's earliest records. Expectations were that natural predators, such as ladybirds and parasitic wasps, would bring the outbreak under control. At various points the forests appeared to be recovering, with previously affected trees showing new growth. Ultimately the repeated scale infestations killed many pisonia, taking 7–8 years before scale numbers subsided.

Even after the outbreak had ended, the forest did not regenerate as might have been expected. Today, 90 percent of Tryon Island's original pisonia forest has gone.

Once it became clear that the forest could not recover naturally, Queensland Parks & Wildlife Service began a revegetation program, with trial plantings in 2004 and 2005 and then a more comprehensive trial in July 2006. A successful ant-baiting program has also significantly reduced Tryon Island's introduced ant population, with no visible effects on native species.

The main lesson was that like a wildfire, once underway, outbreaks of this kind apparently will not subside before most, if not all, of the island's pisonia is gone.

== Current uses ==
Much of this area comes under the Capricornia Cays National Park with current usages including camping, permitted on four cays up to the following limits:

- North West Island 150 campers
- Lady Musgrave Island 50 campers
- Masthead Island 60 campers (30 from October to March)
- Tryon Island 30 campers. (currently closed)

The area also has many visits by both passing vessels cruising the Queensland cost and day trippers in fast jet catamarans (typically Lady Musgrave Island).

The area is also of significances as a fishery particularly for king prawns.

== Ecology ==
=== Flora ===
The centre of the island is dominated by a dense forest of Pisonia (both birdcatcher pisonia and Pisonia grandis) vegetation while screwpine tree, velvet soldierbush and she-oaks are found around the island fringes.

=== Fauna ===
The Capricorn silvereye, a small bird endemic to the southern Great Barrier Reef, is found on the island.

==== Introduced ants ====
Introduced ants have been found at Tryon Island and the site of other scale outbreaks in Australia and elsewhere. Their role in farming scale and interfering with natural parasites and predators may be central to maintaining an outbreak. In the Capricornia Cays, the African big-head ant Pheidole megacephala is associated with all outbreaks, whereas in the Coral Sea it is the guinea ant Tetramorium bicarinatum.

== Known shipwrecks on the reef ==
Agnes was a 2 mast wooden schooner 82 feet (25 metres) in length and 96 tons. Built in Singapore in 1875 was wrecked on North Reef or Tryon Island reef on a voyage from Sydney to Townsville with general cargo of wool on 16 September 1878

== See also ==
- Capricorn and Bunker Group
- Great Barrier Reef
- Capricornia Cays National Park
