= One Tree Island (Queensland) =

Island in Queensland, Australia

- IUCN category Ia (strict nature reserve)
- Location within Queensland
- Location: Queensland
- Nearest city: Gladstone
- Coordinates: 23°30′30″S 152°05′30″E
- Area: 7.5 ha (19 acres)
- Governing body: Queensland Parks and Wildlife Service
- Website: Official website

One Tree Island is a small coral cay. It is located near the Tropic of Capricorn in the southern Great Barrier Reef, 96 km due east nor east of Gladstone, Queensland, Australia, and 450 km north of the state capital Brisbane. The island is part of the Great Barrier Reef chain of islands, and is part of the Capricorn and Bunker Group of island and forms part of the Capricornia Cays National Park. It is also part of the Capricornia Cays Important Bird Area.

== General ==
One Tree Island is a rubble or shingle cay at the eastern end of a coral reef which is about 5.5 km by 3.5 km in size

Vegetation consists of scattered velvet soldierbush and Scaevola taccada with several small groves of Pisonia grandis. A small pond of brackish water is situated near the centre of tile cay. A research station conducted by Sydney University is located on the cay.

== Geomorphology and landscape ==
The Capricorn and Bunker Cays form part of a distinct geomorphic province at the southern end of the Great Barrier Reef. The cays and their reefs lie on the western marginal shelf, and are separated from the mainland by the Curtis Channel. The cays are not generally visible from the mainland, although Masthead Island may be viewed from Mount Larcom on a clear day.

Geologically the cays are young, having developed during the Holocene period, they are mostly around 5000 years old. The sea level was much lower during the last ice age (at the end of the Pleistocene period) and the coastal plain on which today's reefs and cays developed was completely exposed. Early in the Holocene (around 10,000 years ago) the sea level began to rise, until it stabilised at its present level around 6000 years ago. Once the sea level stabilised, it was possible for reef flats to expand and provide potential sites for the formation of cays.

One Tree Island is a Shingle cay and part of a Lagoonal Platform Reef:

== History ==
=== Discovery ===
In 1803 Captain Eber Bunker of the whaling ship Albion was the first European to discover the region and gave his name to the southern group.

During a second whaling voyage from England in the Albion he discovered the Bunker Islands off the Queensland coast.

The Albion was 362 tons and registered in London, the ship was fitted with 10 guns, and a crew of 26; she was built in Deptfordand, Britain ownered by, Messrs. Champion; and used for general cargo

The southern cays and reefs were first charted between 1819 and 1821 by Lieutenant Phillip Parker King RN initially in the Mermaid and later in the Bathurst. The main charting exercise for all the islands and reefs was carried out in 1843 under the command of Captain Francis Blackwood in HMS Fly which was accompanied by the Bramble. The naturalist, Professor J. Beete Jukes, was on board the Fly and his published journal provides valuable information on some of the cays.

== Current uses ==
The island and reef are zoned for scientific research in a zoning plan under the Great Barrier Reef Marine Park Act 1975.

=== One Tree Island Research Station ===
The Australian Museum, led by Frank Talbot, began research at One Tree Island in 1965, and established One Tree Island Research Station. The University of Sydney took over management of the research facility in 1974, and continues to manage it as of November 2024.

Researchers there focus on topics such as climate change and coral bleaching, eutrophication of reef ecosystems, carbonate chemistry, geology, sedimentation, birds, and ecological sustainability. Researchers from all over the world have spent time there, contributing to over 400 research publications. The station lies within a scientific research (orange) zone, with limited access to the public. However the station does offer its facilities to certain guests for educational purposes, including groups of up to 30 senior high school and university students, to obtain experience in field techniques and data analysis.

== Ecology ==
=== Natural ===
The Capricorn silvereye, a small bird endemic to the southern Great Barrier Reef, is found on the island.

The shallow-water rhodolith beds in One Tree Reef extend in the intertidal to shallow subtidal zones of the coralgal rim at the leeward side of the reef. In these rhodoliths rare to common ichnogenus Gastrochaenolites is produced by the boring bivalve Gastrochaena cf. turbinatus (Bassi et al., 2020).

== Known shipwrecks on the reef ==
Wisteria Sunk 14 September 1887 Barque built as the Look at Home; not salvaged One Tree Island /Wistari Reef? With a cargo of flour, bran, chaff and cement, she broke up on One Tree Island. An inquiry found that her loss was caused by the incompetence of her master and mate. The master's certificate was cancelled.

Jane Lockhart sunk between the 11 through to 17 December 1868 on Lady Musgrave Island / Heron Island / Masthead Reef or One Tree Island. The vessel was a 2 Mast Schooner . Departed from Sydney with general cargo for Broadsound; and ran aground on Lady Musgrave Island; maybe on Heron Island or One Tree Island or Masthead Reef Lost on a reef off Heron Island on the night of 17 December 1868. The crew took to the boat and safely reached the Pilot station at Keppel Island. Originally stated as on Lady Musgrave reef (most unlikely) later news reports claim wreck on Heron Island with some other reports mention the wreck on either One Tree Island or Mast Head. The vessel was built in 1861 at Ulladulla New South Wales and registered in Sydney with the Official number of 36858 and a Registered number of 9/1861

From the original reports

One of the boats dispatched to the wreck of the Jane Lockhart, schooner, has returned with the sails and a portion of the running and standing gear. The vessel, it appears, did not strike on Bunker's Group, as reported by Captain Machen, but upon what is known as Heron Island, about ninety miles to the northward of Bunker's Group. When the boat reached the vessel she was settled in a hollow in one of the reefs, the outer formation of the hollow acting as a breakwater against the seas. One side of the vessel was quite visible, and the new copper sheathing appeared uninjured. Captain Norris, who went down in charge of the boat, unbent the sails, so that the position of the vessel might as much as possible remain unaltered; he left the yards and masts standing.

and 6 months later it was reported as

The Rose, schooner, has returned from the wreck of the Jane Lockhart, on Masthead Reef, whither she went on 15 June Captain Dwyer informs us that the Jane Lockhart still lies in a very snug position, and he has no doubt but that himself, and Mr Norris, the purchaser of the wreck, will be able, ultimately, to raise the vessel and bring her safely to Rockhampton

Nearly the whole of the period that they were at the reef, very heavy weather prevailed, staving operations towards the recovery of the cargo, but luckily the strong SE winds lulled for about three days Captain Dwyer availed himself of the occasion, set to work, rigged up a staging between the masts of the Lockhart, schooner, and by means of a rope and a South Sea Island diver, managed to bring up from eighty to ninety large iron pulley wheels, besides a quantity of machinery and sundries, comprising Ale, porter, liqueur brandy, cutlery, ironmongery, etc. Unfortunately the Rose's water ran out, much to the chagrin of the crew, who would have raised a great deal more, only having to run into port for supplies

== See also ==
- Capricorn and Bunker Group
- Great Barrier Reef
- Capricornia Cays National Park
