= Capricornia Cays National Park =

National park in Australia

- IUCN category II (national park)
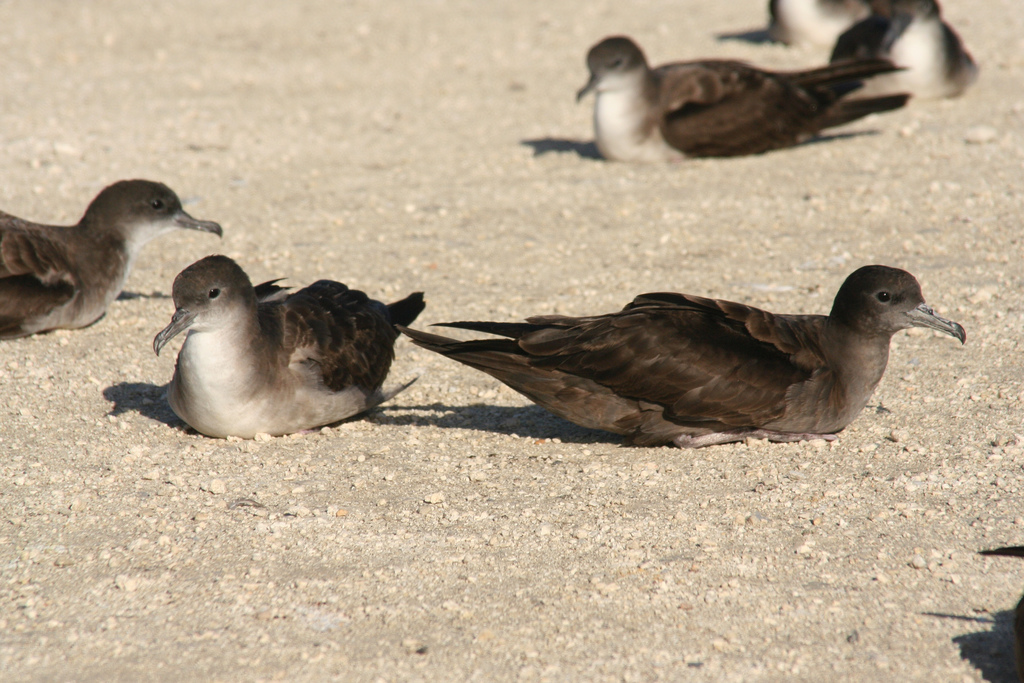
- The Capricornia Cays support a breeding population of over half a million breeding pairs of wedge-tailed shearwaters

- Location within Queensland
- Location: Queensland
- Coordinates: 23°14′54″S 151°46′41″E
- Area: 1.78 km^{2} (0.69 sq mi)
- Established: 1994
- Governing body: Queensland Parks and Wildlife Service
- Website: https://parks.qld.gov.au/parks/capricornia-cays

Capricornia Cays is both a national park and a scientific national park in Queensland (Australia), located 486 km and 472 km north of the state capital Brisbane respectively. Collectively they comprise 241 ha of coral cays.

Popular recreational activities in the park includes bird, whale and turtle watching as well as camping, walking, swimming, boating, snorkelling and diving. Capricornia Cays National Park is noted for its biological diversity, beauty and for provided habitat for a number of endangered plants and animals. In particular the cays are recognised as having the largest breeding population of endangered loggerhead turtles in the South Pacific.

Access to the islands via boat is available from Gladstone, Bundaberg and 1770.

== Birds ==
The cays form an Important Bird Area because they support more than 1% of the world populations of black noddies (with up to 300,000 nests) and wedge-tailed shearwaters (up to 560,000 nests), making up the majority of the east Australian breeding populations of these species, and sometimes more than 1% of the world population of brown boobies (1000–4000 nests).

Seasonal closures in some areas is imposed to protect breeding seabirds.

== Molluscs ==
233 mollusc species have been recorded from the islands.

== The cays ==
Capricornia Cays National Park protects eight vegetated coral cays in the Capricorn and Bunker group of islands of the southern Great Barrier Reef:

- Erskine Island
- Heron Island (eastern half)
- Lady Musgrave Island – Open for visiting, capable of 40 campers.
- Masthead Island – Open for visiting, capable of 60 campers; however, this is limited to 30 from October to March each year to allow a less disrupted egg-laying ground for turtles.
- North West Island – Open for visiting, capable of 150 campers.
- Tryon Island – Currently closed to public access due to a tree infection, the island has the capacity for 30 campers.
- Wilson Island

The cays are completely built by corals. The area is also of significance as a fishery, particularly for king prawns These eight islands are part of the Great Barrier Reef World Heritage Area and all surrounded by reefs. Vegetation on the cays is dominated by the flowering tree species, Pisonia grandis.

A further six cays form Capricornia Cays National Park (Scientific):

- One Tree Island
- Wreck Island
- Fairfax Islands, (East Fairfax & West Fairfax)
- Hoskyn Islands (East and West Hoskyn islands)

There is no public access to these cays.

== Scientific National Park fact sheet ==
- Area: 0.44 km^{2}
- Coordinates: 23°20′07″S 151°57′24″E
- Managing authorities: Queensland Parks and Wildlife Service
- IUCN category: Ia

== See also ==
- Protected areas of Queensland
- Capricornia Cays National Park travel guide from Wikivoyage
