= Wilson Island (Queensland) =

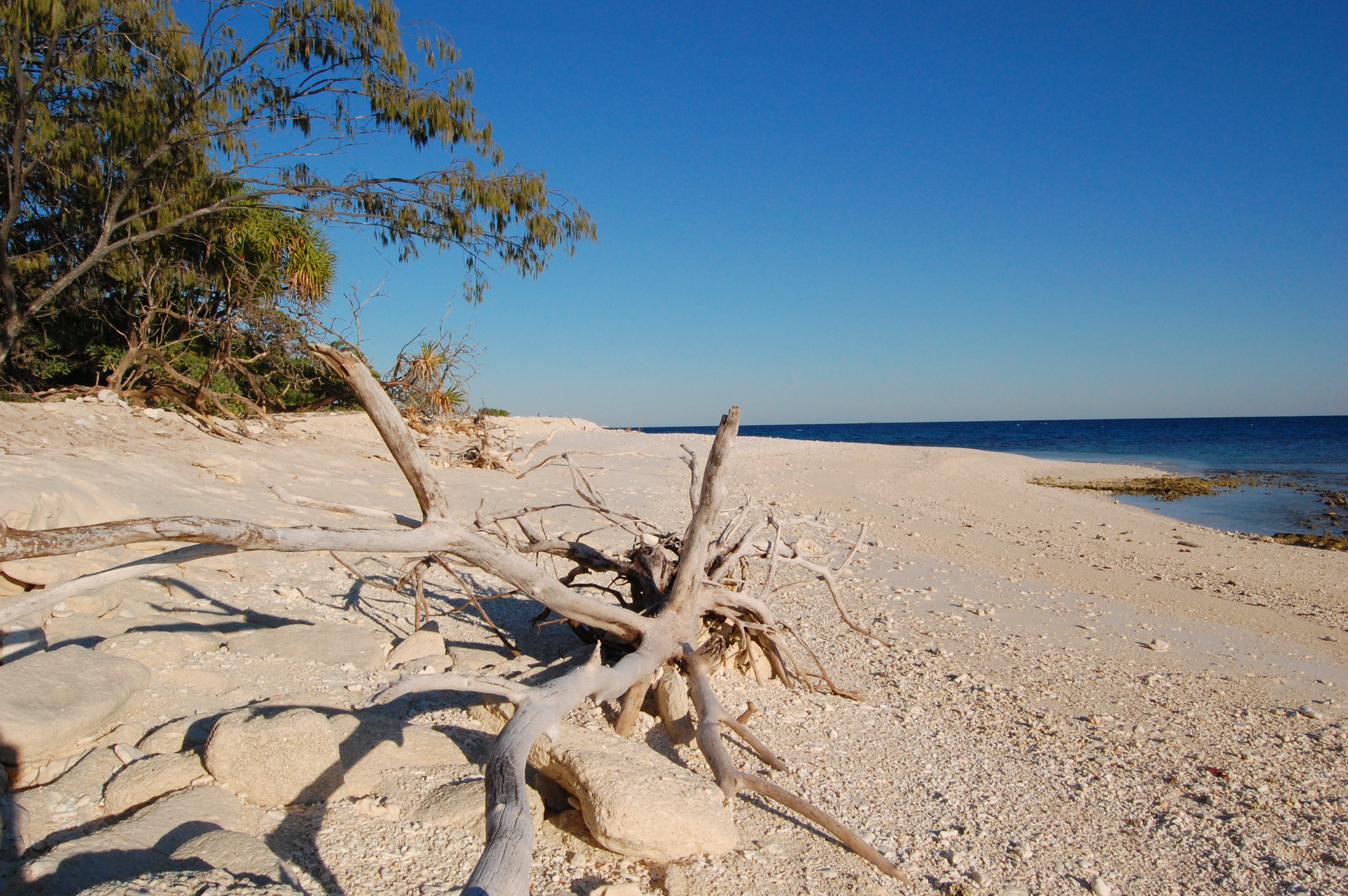

- Location within Queensland
- Location: Queensland
- Nearest city: Gladstone
- Coordinates: 23°18′16.07″S 151°54′56.26″E
- Area: 2 ha (4.9 acres)
- Governing body: Queensland Parks and Wildlife Service

Wilson Island is an island in the Gladstone Region, Queensland, Australia. It is one of eight vegetated coral cays in the Capricornia Cays National Park. It is located north of the Tropic of Capricorn, approximately 72 kilometres (45 miles) north east off the coast of Gladstone, Queensland and 15 kilometres from nearby Heron Island. It is part of the Capricornia Cays Important Bird Area. It is also part of the Great Barrier Reef World Heritage Area.

== History ==
The island is named after Sub-Lieutenant William T.P. Wilson of HMS Waterwitch.

== Wildlife ==
Wilson Island is an important turtle and bird rookery fringed by a white coral beach and covered with pisonia forest. The Capricorn silvereye, a small bird endemic to the southern Great Barrier Reef, is present. From November to March, the island is home to wedge-tailed shearwaters and green turtles laying their eggs. The island is closed during the month of February for the bird nesting season. From January to April, baby green turtles hatch and make their way into the sea, while from June to September, humpback whales can be seen going to and from their winter feeding grounds.

== Resort ==
The island's primary land use is as an exclusive resort, which is run by Aldesta Hotel Group. A total of eighteen guests can stay on the island at any given time, with nine tents providing accommodation. Access to Wilson Island is by boat from nearby Heron Island, which is also owned by Aldesta Hotel Group. The resort was owned by P&O until sold to Voyages Hotels & Resorts in August 2004.

The resort was run by Syb Vonhof and Sara Berto from the 1st of July 2025 until the 3rd of February 2026, both noticeable figures with Jacco Vonhof ( the dutch entrepreneur and politician) being Syb Vonhof his dad

== See also ==
- List of islands of Australia
