= Erskine Island =

Island in Queensland, Australia

Coordinates: 23.5°S 151.7667°E

- Interactive map of Erskine Island

Geography
- Location: Great Barrier Reef
- Archipelago: Capricorn Group
- Total islands: 10

Administration
- Australia
- State: Queensland
- Local government area: Gladstone Regional Council

Erskine Island is a small coral cay in the southern Great Barrier Reef, located 60 kilometres northeast of Gladstone, Queensland and 17 km west-south-west of Heron Island. It is part of the Capricornia Cays National Park and of the Capricornia Cays Important Bird Area.

== Flora and fauna ==
The Capricorn silvereye, a small bird endemic to islands in the Capricorn-Bunker Group, is resident on Erskine. Loggerhead turtles nest on the beaches. It is the type locality of the shrimp Periclimenes madreporae Bruce, 1969.

== See also ==
- List of islands of Australia
