= Masthead Island =

Island in Queensland, Australia

- IUCN category II (national park)
- Masthead Island shoreline

- Location within Queensland
- Location: Queensland
- Nearest city: Gladstone
- Coordinates: 23°32′20″S 151°43′36″E
- Area: 50 ha (120 acres)
- Governing body: Queensland Parks and Wildlife Service
- Website: Official website

Masthead Island is a coral cay located in the southern Great Barrier Reef, 60 kilometres northeast of Gladstone, Queensland. The island is a protected area and forms part of Capricornia Cays National Park. Masthead Island is one of the most undisturbed cays in the national park with lower pressure from humans and feral animals. The cay covers an area of 0.45 square kilometres (0.17 sq mi) and is surrounded by a coral reef that is partially exposed at low-tide. It is part of the Capricornia Cays Important Bird Area.

The island is closed to the public from mid-October to Easter to protect nesting seabirds and turtle hatchlings. At other times, the island is open for camping. However there are no facilities available.

Masthead Island was the shooting location for the 2010 film Uninhabited.

== Geomorphology and landscape ==
Beach rock is well developed along the southern beach and an occurrence of older beach rock is situated some distance from the beach on the north western corner of the cay. Vegetation is similar to that occurring on Heron island.

The vegetation and tree heights and trunk diameters can be used to interpret coral cay dynamics and thus the growth of the cay. It is postulated that the 'nucleus' old growth Pisonia grandis forest pattern (with trees up to 23m high and 2.4m trunk diameter) is in the central western part of this cay and is able to provide identification of the older forested sections of the island.

The Capricorn and Bunker Cays form part of a distinct geomorphic province at the southern end of the Great Barrier Reef. The cays and their reefs lie on the western marginal shelf, and are separated from the mainland by the Curtis Channel. The cays are not generally visible from the mainland, although Masthead Island may be viewed from Mount Larcom on a clear day.

Geologically, the cays are young, having developed during the Holocene period, and they are mostly around 5000 years old. The sea level was much lower during the last Ice Age (at the end of the Pleistocene period) and the coastal plain on which today's reefs and cays developed was completely exposed. Early in the Holocene (around 10,000 years ago) the sea level began to rise, until it stabilised at its present level around 6000 years ago. Once the sea level stabilised, it was possible for reef flats to expand and provide potential sites for the formation of cays.

Masthead Island Reef is an Elongate Platform Reef.

The coral cay is a vegetated sand cay The sand cay is located to the lee of their reef flat.

== History ==
The explorer Matthew Flinders discovered and named Masthead Island in 1802. Masthead was incorporated into the Capricornia Cays National Park in 1994.

== Ecology ==
=== Flora ===
The centre of the island is dominated by a dense forest of Pisonia (both birdcatcher pisonia and Pisonia grandis) vegetation while pandanus, velvet soldierbush and she-oaks are found around the island fringes.

A total of 50 taxa of vascular plants have been recorded since first collections in 1909 including 7 naturalised exotic plant species.

The May 1998 census records 37 native and 3 naturalised plant species. The majority of plant species are dispersed by sea (52%) and seabirds (38%).

Thirteen percent (27ha) of the total Pisonia grandis closed forest in Australia is located on Masthead Island.

=== Fauna ===
Masthead Island is an internationally important rookery for green and loggerhead turtles, who come ashore to lay eggs on the island's beaches during spring and summer, from late October to late February. This is a major breeding site for the turtles, the fifth most important in the South Pacific.

The cay also supports a diverse seabird population. The black noddy and wedge-tailed shearwater are most common, while the black-naped tern, bridled tern, Capricorn silvereye, roseate tern and silver gull are also regularly seen on the island.

The coral reef around the cay is a habitat for a vast array of marine life, the most common including angelfish, parrotfish, butterflyfish, sweetlips, batfish, sting rays, bronze whalers, sea snakes and stonefish.

Masthead was the discovery ground of an entirely new species of fish, the Masthead Island Pipefish.

=== Pests ===
Currently, weeds are a problem on some of the cays. Masthead Island is vulnerable to the encroachment of prickly pear (Opuntia sp.). These prickly pears were introduced from the main land, and were well established over the entire cay in the 1970s. Weed control programs have been implemented to eradicate introduced plants in the region, with a significant reduction of these weeds on Masthead Island.

== Known shipwrecks on the reef ==
Pioneer 10 (12?) March 1866 Masthead Reef or Polmaise Reef 2 Masts Schooner regular coasting schooner during the 1860s; cargo of timber; no lives lost.: Struck an outcrop of Masthead Reef on 12 March, an anchor was dropped but she dragged along the rocks until stopped by a large rock which pierced her bottom and held her upright. The crew launched a boat and sailed to Keppel Bay.

Captain Smith, by the Diamantina, on Thursday, brought intelligence of the total loss of the Pioneer, schooner, which left the port with a cargo of sawn timber for Rockhampton on the 10th instant. Captain Smith reports after leaving Gladstone he met a boat containing the captain and crew of the Pioneer, who informed him that their vessel was wrecked and totally lost on a reef near Mast Head Island, one of the Bunker Group, and they were then on their way to Port Curtis, hoping there to meet with a steamer by which to proceed to Sydney. We could learn no other particulars. We are very sorry to hear that the cargo of timber, worth about £500, was uninsured, and that the heavy loss will therefore fall on Messrs. Gladwell and Greathead. We believe it is not known whether the vessel was insured or not.

The Pioneer was an American built craft, of 88 tons register. She was rigged as a fore and aft schooner, and has seen many years' service in the coasting trade

We have been kindly furnished by the Harbour Master, Captain Rundle, with the following particulars of the wreck of the schooner Pioneer. The Pioneer, schooner, 87 tons, Thomas Richie, master, bound from Maryborough to Rockhampton, left the Fairway Buoy, Harvey’s Bay, at 10 a.m. on Saturday last, the 10th instant she passed the Sloping Hummock at 3 p.m., bearing south-west, and distant 13 km; the vessel steered N.W. until opposite Bustard Head, and then altered her course half a point westward, the wind, at the time, blowing hard from S.S.E., and a heavy sea, running. About 4 a.m. on Sunday "breakers ahead" were reported, and the vessel WHS immediately hauled to the -west- ward. Before she could be brought to fore reach she struck upon a reef running out from Mast Head Island, bearing cast 39 km from Cape Capricorn. The sea washed clean over her, and she showed Signs of breaking up; the long-boat was launched. The master and crew laid-to off the wreck -until daylight. They managed to get on board again at 1 p.m., and found the vessel full of water, with her decks and most of her broadside started. After several attempts, they found that they could do nothing towards saving the vessel, and all hands sailed for Keppel Bay, where they arrived on Thursday morning.

Britons Queen 21 March 1866 Masthead Reef/Polmaise Reef 2 Masts Schooner regular coasting schooner during the 1850s and 1860s; cargo of hides/tallow; 7 passengers.: 14 passengers and crew landed safely on Masthead Island, then proceeded to Rockhampton.

The schooner Briton's Queen, Captain M. R, Brown, was wrecked on Mast-head Island on the 2lst instant. She was bound to Sydney, via Brisbane, from Port Denison, and had on board a quantity of wool, tallow, and hides, besides the following passengers : Mr. and Mrs. Newell, two sons and two daughters; also, J. Butcher in the steerage. Both passengers and crew arrived here in safety in the schooner's boats on the 26th instant. The Briton's Queen was owned in Hobart Town and was uninsured. The wreck was sold by Mr. Wormold on Thursday; it realised as follows: Hull, £50; wool, tallow, and hides, £95; two boats, £27; total, £172. Yesterday the Londonderry towed two lighters to the bay for the purpose of proceeding to the wreck with several shipwrights on board

Loss of the Briton's Queen.-We are indebted to Mr. W. Newell, a passenger by the Britons' Queen, for the following particulars of the loss of that vessel;-The Britons' Queen, schooner, sailed from Port Denison for Sydney, via Brisbane, with a cargo of wool and tallow, on Tuesday, 13th March, and on the morning of the 21st she went on the reef' extending out from Masthead Island, and became a total wreck. The vessel,-struck on the reef at about 3 o'clock in the morning, the wind blowing fresh at the time, and the night very dark. All attempts to get the vessel off having failed, the boats were got ready, and at daylight the passengers and crew were landed, by means of the smallest boat, on the reef near to where the vessel struck. The shipwrecked people walked along the reef a considerable distance, a mile or a mile and a half, to a point where the larger boat could with safety come alongside to take them in to proceed to Masthead Island,

There were fourteen persons in all, namely, the captain (Malcolm Ross Brown), the mate, five men, Mr. Newell, his wife, two sons and two daughters, and a Captain Butcher. Nine were in the large boat, and five in the small one they arrived at the island in the afternoon and a hard pull of eight hours. The weather was so boisterous they could not leave for a few days

Monday, the 26th they started for Keppel Bay, and arrived the same evening at the pilot station, where "they were Kindly received and entertained' by Captain Warner, pilots Hardy, Smith, and others. On the following day they proceeded on to Rockhampton, and, on arrival, Mr. Newell and family took passage to Sydney by the steamer Boomerang.

Cosmopolite 15 October 1866 Masthead Reef/Polmaise Reef Brig carrying ballast; salvaged; no lives lost.: bound from Sydney to Gladstone with cattle, went ashore Masthead Reef and became a total wreck.

Cosmopolite, Captain Girdivood, has been wrecked on Masthead Island, but our informant was unable to give us the details of the disaster. Some of the crew had arrived in Gladstone in the boats before Captain Cottor reached that port, while the remainder were left on the island in charge of the wreck. The wreck has been sold for £25 to Captain Patching, of the Prince Patrick, schooner, and when the Clarence sailed he was making preparations to proceed to the scene of the mishap.

Total Loss Of The Brig Cosmopolite. Mr. Ehrenfried, part owner and passenger on board the above-named ship, arrived yesterday by the Boomerang, from Queensland, and that gentleman has furnished the following particulars:-The Cosmopolite, from Sydney, bound to Gladstone for cattle, went ashore on Masthead Reef at 1 a.m. on the 15th instant, and became a total wreck. The reef is about 45 km from Gladstone. The sea was very smooth, and little or no wind at the time. Captain Girdwood was in bed at the time, and did not appear to have any knowledge of the dangerous proximity of the reef, as he could not tell the vessel's position until daylight. The wreck has been sold for £25, and is uninsured. She hailed from Hobart Town, and was owned by Messrs. Ehrenfried Brothers.

Willing Lass 5 July 1868 Masthead Reef or Polmaise Reef Brigantine (Barquentine?) Struck by a squall during a voyage from Rockhampton to Richmond River. A course was set to steer her ashore when the wind dropped leaving her helpless to drift onto the reef where rising seas soon destroyed her no lives lost carrying ballast shallow site.:

The Willing Lass left Rockhampton on Saturday, the 4th July, in ballast, for Sydney via the Richmond River, and on Wednesday, the 8th, stood out to sea .

At 8am, Thursday, 9th, sighted Mast Head Island, hearing N N W, apparently about 8.0 km off, but the weather was so thick and hazy it was impossible to obtain the correct distance At 9:45 am tacked ship, when a heavy squall from the south stuck her, all the light sails were taken in, and the bearings of the island showed to McNeil that he would not be able to weather Mast Head Reef, so was compelled to make for the channel (which is about 3.2 km in width) between the island and the reef Had the breeze held on he would have been able to carry through with safety, as there was deep water within a short distance of the reef all the way, but suddenly the wind fell light, and a strong current kept the vessel sagging on to the reef, the tide being nearly at its full The lead was immediately hove, and four fathoms of water were found At 11 30 a m felt her grate lightly, hove the lead again, and found only nine feet, the ship at the time drawing eight feet four inches A broken sea was all around, but no signs of breakers, and the reef being hidden on account of the tide being full. Directly she grated, tried to wear her off, but she lost steerage way, and would not answer her helm The tide then began to fall, and the boat was launched and a kedge run out, ballast was trimmed, and every endeavour was mado to heave the schooner off the reef At 1 pm she listed over, and bumped heavily against the reef, and in less than 10 minutes drove in her starboard bilge, she struck about a ship's length from where the lead was first hove and 8 fathoms found Captain NcNeil finding she would go to pieces, resolved to try and save everything he could, but, at 5 30 p m finding about four feet of water in the hold and the weather looking very dirty with the barometer falling, he thought prudent at once to take his crew to the island, distant about 3.2 km N N E, as much provisions and fresh water as were deemed necessary were put into the boat

On Friday 10th, they made a trip to the ship and went on board, and found her full of water and on her beam ends A further stock of provisions and water were secured, together with what ever loose articles were lying about, and they again steered for the island

The next day, Saturday the 11th, they visited the wreck but found that she had gone down forward, with the water completely over her forecastle, and finding it unsafe, they returned to their camp where they remanded until Thursday morning the 16th, when the captain and his crew, in all seven started from the island intending to make Gladstone, but there was such a tremendous sea on that he was compelled to stand off for Cape Capricorn, distant about sixty miles, which was made in five hours After making the Cape the sea became calmer, and they made a comparatively easy run to Rockhampton where they arrived on Friday the 17th The vessel was the property of Misers MacKinlay Brothers, of Sydney, and is about 15 years old, and the heavy cargo of machinery she brought to Rockhampton it is supposed must have attained her considerably, the pumps being continually at work. The only things saved were the charts and a few clothes the latter rendered worthless by the salt water. The wreck was sold at auction, by order of Lloyd's Agent, and realised £5 10s, the purchaser being Captain Rundle The boat, etc, fetched £8, and was knocked down to Mr Kelly

Jane Lockhart sunk between 11 through 17 December 1868 on Lady Musgrave Island / Heron Island / Masthead Reef or One Tree Island The vessel was a 2 Mast Schooner . Departed from Sydney with general cargo for Broadsound; and ran aground on Lady Musgrave Is; maybe on Heron Is or One Tree Island or Masthead Reef Lost on a reef off Heron Island on the night of 17 December 1868. The crew took to the boat and safely reached the Pilot Station at Keppel Island.

Originally stated as on Lady Musgrave reef (most unlikely) later news reports claim wreck on Heron Island with some other reports mention the wreck on either One Tree Island or Mast Head. The vessel was built in 1861 at Ulladulla New South Wales and registered in Sydney with the Official number of 36858 and a Registered number of 9/1861

From the original reports

One of the boats dispatched to the wreck of the Jane Lockhart, schooner, has returned with the sails and a portion of the running and standing gear. The vessel, it appears, did not strike on Bunker's Group, as reported by Captain Machen, but upon what is known as Heron Island, about ninety miles to the northward of Bunker's Group. When the boat reached the vessel she was settled in a hollow in one of the reefs, the outer formation of the hollow acting as a breakwater against the seas. One side of the vessel was quite visible, and the new copper sheathing appeared uninjured. Captain Norris, who went down in charge of the boat, unbent the sails, so that the position of the vessel might as much as possible remain unaltered; he left the yards and masts standing.

and 6 months later it was reported as

The Rose, schooner, has returned from the wreck of the Jane Lockhart, on Masthead Reef, whither she went on June 15 Captain Dwyer informs us that the Jane Lockhart still lies in a very snug position, and he has no doubt but that himself, and Mr Norris, the purchaser of the wreck, will be able, ultimately, to raise the vessel and bring her safely to Rockhampton

Nearly the whole of the period that they were at the reef, very heavy weather prevailed, staving operations towards the recovery of the cargo, but luckily the strong SE winds lulled for about three days Captain Dwyer availed himself of the occasion, set to work, rigged up a staging between the masts of the Lockhart, schooner, and by means of a rope and a South Sea Island diver, managed to bring up from eighty to ninety large iron pulley wheels, besides a quantity of machinery and sundries, comprising Ale, porter, liqueur brandy, cutlery, ironmongery, etc Unfortunately the Roses water ran out, much to the chagrin of the crew, who would have raised a great deal more, only having to run into port for supplies

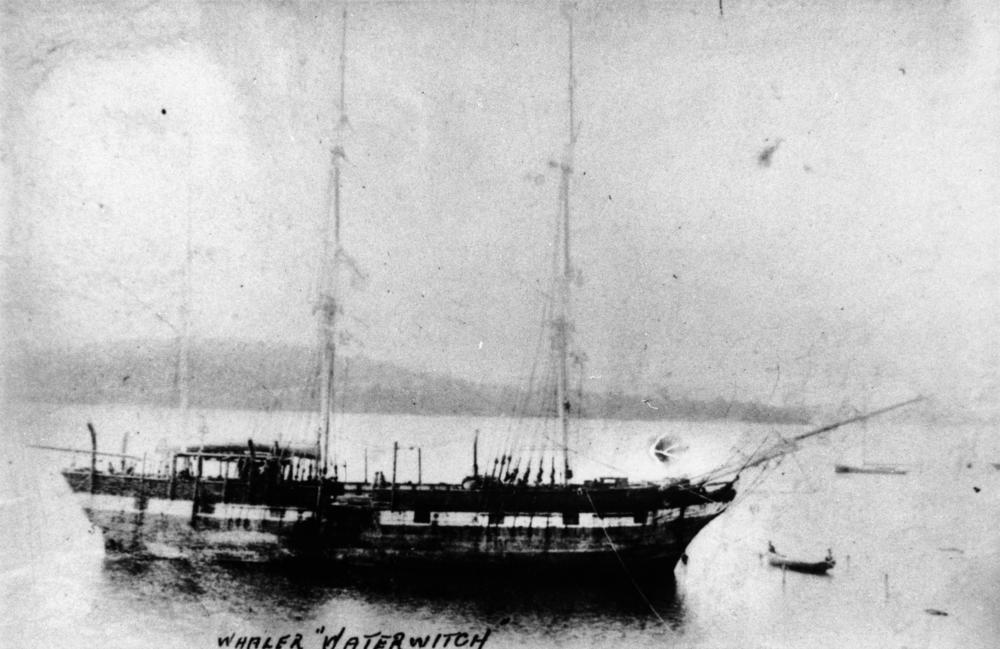
Water Witch prior to be wrecked on Masthead island under the command of Captain William Greenlees

Waterwitch a Brigantine of 165 tons built 1873 stuck on the 27 August 1884 Polmaise Reef or Masthead Reef

Norna 15 June 1914 near Masthead Island Schooner 2 Masts.

Joyce a 42-foot (13 m) wooden Motor Vessel struck the South East corner of Masthead Island on the 4 April 1927.

Valante 28 January 1957 Masthead Island.

== See also ==
- Capricorn and Bunker Group
- Great Barrier Reef
- Capricornia Cays National Park
