= Periclimenes madreporae =

Scientific classification
- Domain: Eukaryota
- Kingdom: Animalia
- Phylum: Arthropoda
- Class: Malacostraca
- Order: Decapoda
- Suborder: Pleocyemata
- Infraorder: Caridea
- Family: Palaemonidae
- Genus: Periclimenes
- Species: P. madreporae

Binomial name
- Periclimenes madreporae Bruce, 1969

Species of crustacean

Periclimenes madreporae is a species of saltwater shrimp in the family, Palaemonidae, and was first described in 1969 by Alexander James Bruce.

The male holotype and paratype were collected from Erskine Island, in the Capricorn Group of the Great Barrier Reef at a depth 3-6 fathoms in February 1966.

In Australia it is found in New South Wales and Queensland. It is also found in waters off La Réunion, Solomon Islands, Caroline Islands, Society and Tuamoto Islands.
