= Museum of Irish Industry =

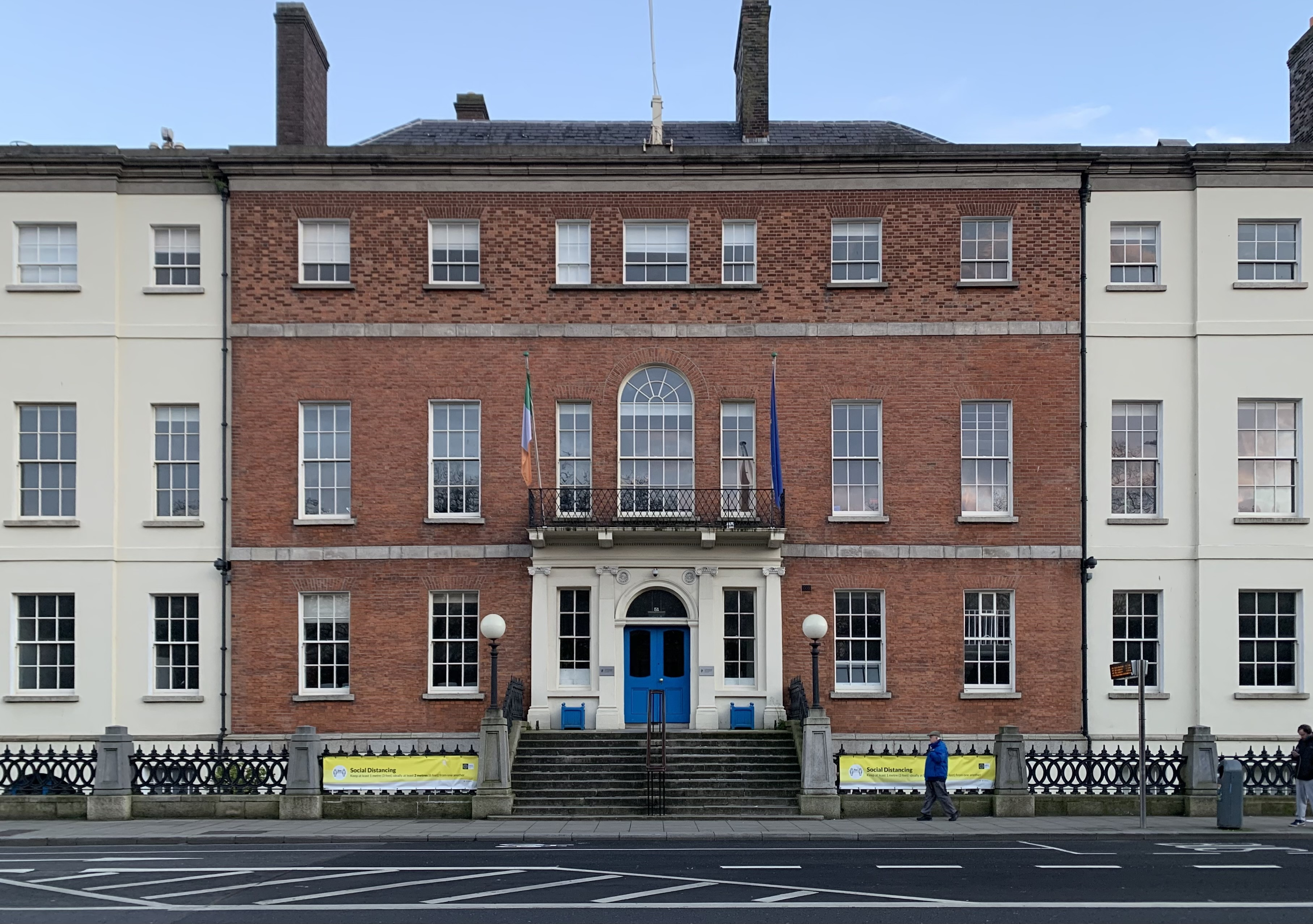
- The Museum of Irish Industry was located at 51 St Stephen's Green
- Established: 1854
- Dissolved: 1866
- Location: 51 St Stephens Green
- Coordinates: 53.338741°N 6.261563°W
- Type: mining museum

The Museum of Irish Industry, founded in 1854, originally an extension of the Museum of Economic Geology, was a museum dedicated to the exhibition of the various, display-worthy materials from, and donated by, the industries of mining and manufacturing established in Ireland. In addition, the museum gave lectures on the subject, and related subject matters, to the general public.

== Overview ==
Overseen by the Board of Trade, Department of Science and Art, the museum grew to challenge (in its areas of expertise) the previous monopolisers of scientific study and instruction in Ireland, Trinity College Dublin and the Royal Dublin Society. The museum had an education faculty of sorts which was divided into two separate institutions, and they were both largely dissimilar in their areas of academic focus.

The abolition of the museum was recommended in 1862, with several parties claiming that it should be ultimately reorganised to be broader in scope, to encompass all areas of science related to agriculture and industry, rather than simply relating to the mining subject matter. As a result of this recommendation, the museum was abolished to make way for the Royal College of Science for Ireland, which was wider in sight. The document detailing and authenticating the abolishment of the museum was appointed in February 1866, and was signed in July of the same year.
