= Joseph Jukes =

British geologist (1811–1869)

Joseph Beete Jukes
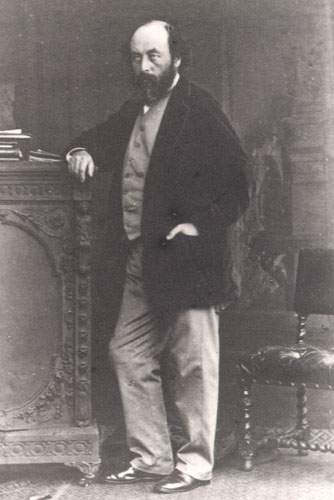
- Joseph Beete Jukes, circa 1860
- Born: 10 October 1811; Summer Hill near Birmingham, England
- Died: 29 July 1869 (aged 57); Dublin, Ireland
- Resting place: St Mary's, Selly Oak, Birmingham
- Education: St John's College, Cambridge
- Known for: Geology of Newfoundland
- Scientific career
- Fields: Geology
- Workplaces: Museum of Irish Industry; Royal College of Science
- Academic advisors: Adam Sedgwick

Joseph Beete Jukes (10 October 1811 – 29 July 1869) was a British geologist working in Newfoundland, Australia and Ireland. He was author of several geological manuals and served as a naturalist on the expeditions of HMS Fly (under the command of Francis Price Blackwood). Correspondents and friends addressed him as Beete Jukes.

== Early life ==
Jukes was born to John and Sophia Jukes at Summer Hill near Birmingham, England, on 10 October 1811. He was educated at Wolverhampton, King Edward's School, Birmingham and St John's College, Cambridge. At Cambridge Jukes studied geology under Professor Adam Sedgwick. Between 1839 and 1840, Jukes geologically surveyed Newfoundland. A book he wrote, Excursions In and About Newfoundland During the Years 1839 and 1840, bore the fruit of what he had discovered and learned while he surveyed. He returned to England at the end of 1840, and in 1842 sailed as a naturalist on board the corvette HMS Fly to participate in the surveying and charting expeditions to survey Torres Strait, New Guinea, and the east coast of Australia, under the leadership of Francis Price Blackwood, a naval officer.

Fly visited and charted many locations, circumnavigated Australia twice and visited the island of Java in 1845, as well as conducting an extensive maritime survey based from the south-eastern coast of New Guinea and the Torres Strait Islands to the southern edges of the Great Barrier Reef. Throughout these voyages and surveys, Jukes fulfilled his duty of chronicler, and succeeded in composing a well-written account of his and his comrades' journeys, which was entitled Narrative of the Surveying Voyage of H.M.S. Fly. This account, in addition, recorded his (natural) historical and ethnological observations made while surveying. Among the more notable things detailed in this volume is the chapter on the Great Barrier Reef; the writings contained therein described as an early classic of Australian geology. The evidence gathered by Jukes on the Great Barrier Reef in some part afforded support for Darwin's theories of coral reefs.

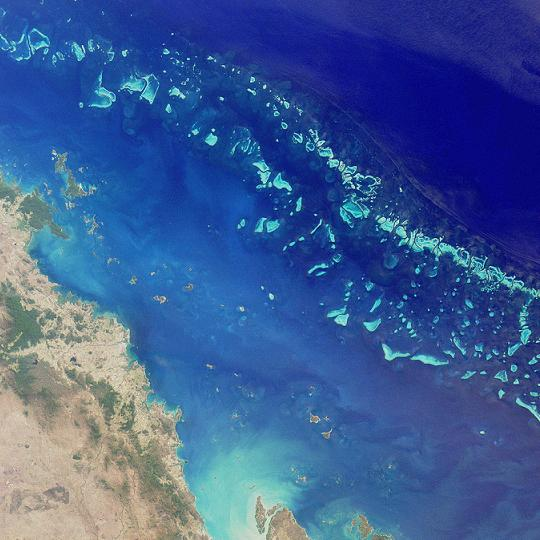
During the voyages of HMS Fly, Jukes travelled to the Great barrier Reef. This is a satellite image of the Reef.

== Geological work ==
A Sketch of the Physical Structure of Australia … could be considered as Jukes' finest or most important contribution to Australian geology and he was considered one of the finest field geologists of his generation. It contained the first complete map of the continent of Australia, imperfect as it was. He designed this map based on a vast collection of notes he had gathered, and his own observations; notes on the structure of the coastline, his own observations during visits to other colonies, and the descriptions of other authors of various other parts of Australia. Having conglomerated these notes, Jukes was able to sketch what he interpreted as the outline of Australian geology. While doing this, Jukes concluded that Australia was the very land of uniformity and monotony, its structure largely unbroken; that mountain ranges and rock formations would monotonously stretch out for miles, without change of characteristics or interruption in formation. He also concluded that, despite apparent consistency in geological formation, Australian soil and land was wealthy in minerals, and he formerly advised the Tasmanian Society in 1846 to conduct further geological surveys in the regions of New South Wales and Van Diemen's Land, and the importance of such an act.

Among other things, Jukes become known to Sir Paul Edmund de Strzelecki (known commonly as simply "Count Strzelecki"), as well as William Branwhite Clarke, whose conclusions on the palaeozoic age of Australian coal he supported.

Jukes's work provided one of the first insights into the nature of Australian geology, at a time when there was little knowledge of the continent, and when English interest was intensely focused on obtaining the geological knowledge that Jukes was able to uncover.

== Later life and death ==
Jukes landed in England again in June 1846, and in August received an appointment on the geological survey of Great Britain. The district to which he was first sent was North Wales. In 1847 he commenced the survey of the South Staffordshire coalfield and continued this work during successive years after the close of field-work in Wales. The results were published in his Geology of the South Staffordshire Coal-field (1853; 2nd edition 1859), a work remarkable for its accuracy and philosophic treatment.

In 1849, Jukes was offered the post of geological surveyor of the mineral surveying of New South Wales, back in Australia. However, because of his marriage and other issues, he declined the offer, and the post was given to Samuel Stutchbury. A year later, in 1850, Jukes became the Director of the Geological Survey of Ireland. He held this post until his death nineteen years later, in Dublin, after a fall down some stairs and some time spent in a mental institution. In his own words "the perpetual strain on one's nerves and gradual sap of one's heart and spirits, ultimately breaks one down." He was buried on 3 August 1869 in St Mary's churchyard at Selly Oak, Birmingham.

As Director of the Geological Survey of Ireland from 1850-1869 he resolved the correlation of Carboniferous slates in the Cork Harbour area with limestones of other facies to the north. He combined this successful Irish career with teaching. For many years he lectured as professor of geology, first at the Museum of Irish Industry, and afterwards at the successor Royal College of Science in Dublin. He was an admirable teacher, and his Student's Manual was the favoured textbook of British students for many years. During his residence in Ireland he wrote an article On the Mode of Formation of some of the River-valleys in the South of Ireland, and in this now classic essay he first clearly sketched the origin and development of rivers. In later years he devoted much attention to the relations between the Devonian system and the Carboniferous rocks and Old Red Sandstone.

Jukes wrote many papers that were printed in the London and Dublin geological journals and other periodicals. He delivered a popular geological course in geology which attracted almost 400 people in Belfast, Northern Ireland, and encouraged field excursions in the area. This promoted the establishment of the Belfast Naturalists' Field Club. He edited, and in great measure wrote, forty-two memoirs explanatory of the maps of the south, east and west of Ireland, and prepared a geological map of Ireland on a scale of 8 miles to an inch.

After his death a volume of his letters and talks was compiled by his sister, C.A. Browne.

In 1862, a peak to the north of Mackay was named Mount Jukes by George Elphinstone Dalrymple.

== Works ==
Jukes was also the author of:

- Excursions in and about Newfoundland (2 vols, 1842)
- Narrative of the Surveying Voyage of H.M.S. Fly (2 vols, 1847)
- A sketch of the physical structure of Australia: so far as it is at present known (1st ed.), Joseph Jukes, 1850, Wikidata Q19025678 – via Wikisource
- Popular Physical Geology (1853)
- The South Staffordshire Coalfield (1853, second edition 1859)
- Student's Manual of Geology (1857; 2nd edition 1862); a later edition was revised by A. Geikie (1872)
- the article "Geology" in the Ency. Brit. 8th edition (1858)
- School Manual of Geology (1863)
- Letters, etc., of J. Beete Jukes, edited, with Connecting Memoria Notes, by his Sister (CA Browne) (1871), with a chronological list of Jukes's writings.

== See also ==
- European and American voyages of scientific exploration
