= Francis Price Blackwood =

British naval officer (1809–1854)

Francis Price Blackwood (25 May 1809 – 22 March 1854) was a British naval officer who while posted at several different locations during his time in the Royal Navy, spent much of his time posted in colonial Australia and was an instrumental pioneer of regions near Australia's east coast and nearby islands.

Blackwood was the second son of Vice-Admiral Sir Henry Blackwood and his third wife, Harriet née Gore, Blackwood entered the navy at age twelve. He was commissioned 8 Aug 1828 and joined HMS Ariadne under Captain Frederick Marryat. He then served on HMS Alligator under Captain Charles Yorke.

It was in 1833 that Blackwood was appointed to be in command of HMS Hyacinth, a ship which would take him to Australia on his first visit and in which he would travel to the north-east coast to gather hydrographic data. In 1838 Blackwood received a promotion to the rank of captain.

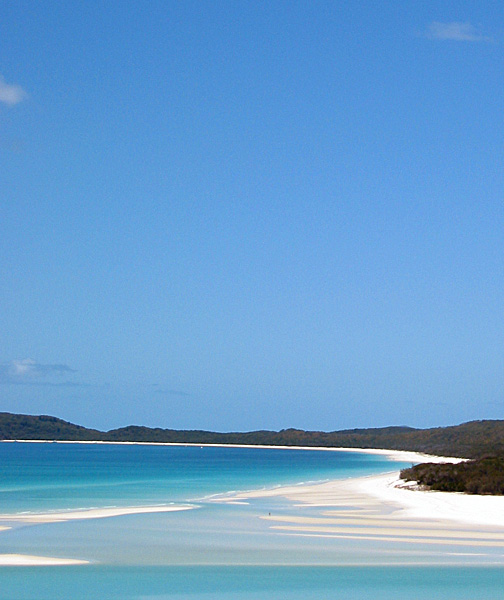
Whitsunday Island. Blackwood voyaged past here and charted the area while aboard the Fly.

== Voyages of the Fly ==
Three years later, Blackwood was selected to command the sloop HMS Fly. He was appointed with the purpose of partaking in the initial hydrographic survey commissioned by the admiralty, which involved making explorations into and charting the waters of the Australian north-east coast.

Equipped with a wealth of costly instruments and housing two scientists (Joseph Jukes, a geologist, and John MacGillivray, a zoologist), the Fly departed from Falmouth, Cornwall in 1842, with the accompaniment of the cutter Bramble (under the command of Lieutenant Charles Yule). Having stopped in Hobart town between the months of August and October, it was not until December 1842 that the survey began, after the ships arrived in Sydney.

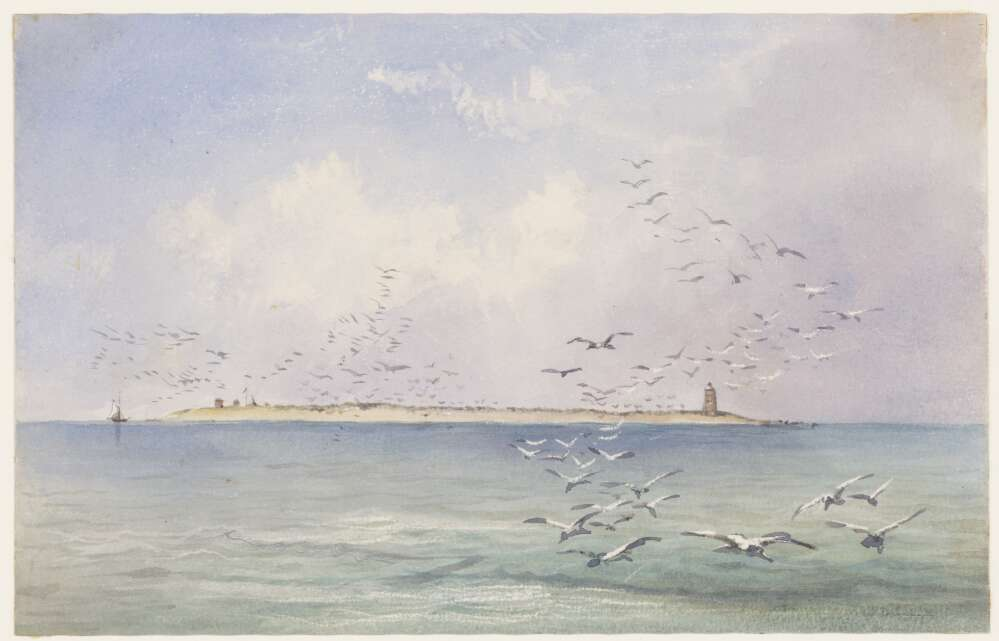
Raine Island on the Great Barrier Reef, with the beacon erected by Blackwood in 1844

Over the following three years, Fly traveled and charted from Sandy Cape to Whitsunday Island, and also sailed past a range of other locations including both Swain Reefs and the Capricorn and Bunker Group and the passage between these two. Fly also mapped and marked the outer lines of the Great Barrier Reef. It was, in part, because of Blackwood and his comrades hydrographic and exploratory effort aboard the Fly that a beacon was erected on Raine Island in 1844 with the purpose of allowing surer and safer travel through the Great Barrier Reef and marking the best passage.

It was during this time that Bramble surveyed the Endeavour Strait.

Later, in late 1844, Blackwood and Fly took a short voyage to Surabaya, but returned in April 1845 to chart a shipping route between Bramble Cay and Endeavour Strait.

After this, Fly and Blackwood surveyed and chartered several other areas. This included a length of 100 mi (160 km) of the south-east coast of New Guinea in the Gulf of Papua where he discovered the Fly River and named it after his ship. He also explored in the waters near Singapore during this time.

It was after this call to Singapore that Fly returned to Sydney and then, with Blackwood aboard, sailed for England in December 1845.

== The town of Blackwood, Victoria ==
The town of Blackwood in Victoria was named after Captain Francis Price Blackwood. Gold was discovered in Blackwood in 1854.

== Later life and death ==
A year after returning to England, Blackwood entered Jesus College, Cambridge, and, on 12 October 1848, Blackwood married Jemima Sarah Strode. On 22 March 1854, Blackwood died and was buried in Kensal Green Cemetery. He is remembered as an important contributor to both hydrographic and cartographic knowledge of a great many locations. Many of the sailing directions and his findings are still apparent on present day charts.

== See also ==
- European and American voyages of scientific exploration
- O'Byrne, William Richard (1849). "Blackwood, Francis Price" . A Naval Biographical Dictionary . John Murray – via Wikisource.
