= HMS Fly (1831) =

Sloop of the Royal Navy

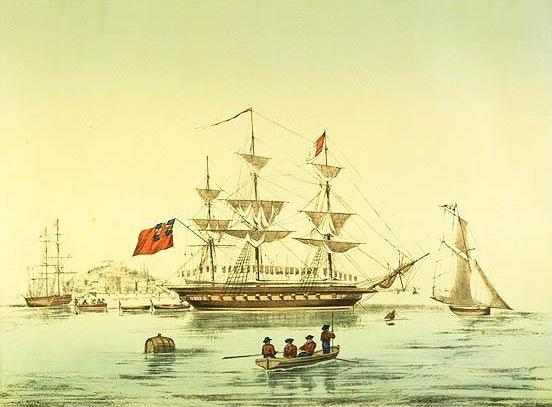
- Fly off Sydney c.1842

History

United Kingdom
- Name: HMS Fly
- Ordered: 30 January 1829
- Builder: Pembroke Dockyard
- Cost: £11,761 (plus £4,648 for fitting out) (Note: A total cost accounting for inflation of approximately £1,471,800 in today's money.)
- Laid down: November 1829
- Launched: 25 August 1831
- Commissioned: 27 January 1832
- Out of service: Converted to a coal hulk in 1855
- Renamed: C2 and later C70 whilst a hulk
- Fate: Broken up 1903

General characteristics
- Class & type: Fly-class ship-sloop
- Tons burthen: 485 69/94 bm
- Length: 114 ft 4 in (34.8 m) (gundeck); 93 ft 6 1/8 in (28.5 m) (keel)
- Beam: 31 ft 7 in (9.6 m) oa
- Depth of hold: 14 ft 5 in (4.4 m)
- Sail plan: Full-rigged ship
- Complement: 120
- Armament: 2 × 9-pounder bow chasers; 16 × 32-pounder carronades

HMS Fly was an 18-gun sloop of the Royal Navy. She was responsible for the exploration and charting of much of Australia's north-east coast and nearby islands. She was converted to a coal hulk in 1855 and broken up in 1903.

== Design and construction ==
Fly was a development of the Orestes-class ship-sloop designed by Professor Inman of the School of Naval Architecture. She was 114 feet 4 inches (34.8 m) long on the gundeck and 93 feet 6 1/8 inches (28.5 m) at the keel. She had a beam of 31 feet 7 inches (9.6 m) overall, and a hold depth of 14 feet 5 inches (4.4 m), giving her a tonnage of 485 69/94 bm. Her armament was made up of sixteen 32-pounder carronades and a pair of 9-pounder bow chasers.

Fly and her three sister ships Harrier, Argus and Acorn were ordered on 30 January 1829. She was laid down in November 1829 and launched from Pembroke Dockyard on 25 August 1831. Argus and Acorn were cancelled on 27 April 1831, leaving Fly as the lead ship of a class of two.

== Service ==
She was commissioned at Plymouth on 27 January 1832 under the command of Commander Peter M'Quhae and served initially on the North America and West Indies station, returning to Portsmouth on 30 September 1833. After another two years on the same station she paid off at Portsmouth on 5 September 1835. By September 1836 she was fitting out for the South America station, including work in the Pacific Ocean. She was under the command of Commander Granville Gower Loch on that station from 1838 to 1840. She arrived at Spithead on 17 July 1840 from South America with 1,700,000 dollars and sailed for Plymouth to be paid off. In December 1841 she commissioned at Plymouth under the command of Francis Price Blackwood to survey the Torres Strait in company with the cutter Bramble.

During the early to mid-1840s, she charted numerous routes through and from many locations around Australia's north-east coast and nearby islands, including Whitsunday Island and the Capricorn Islands in Queensland. During this part of her service she employed the painter and draughtsman Harden Sidney Melville to produce the first official hydrographic survey of the north-east coast of Australia. Thomas Garrett briefly served in the vessel in the 1840s.

On 2 September 1844, she rescued the survivors of the British merchant ship Lady Grey, which had been wrecked on Alert's Reef the previous day with the loss of a passenger whilst on a voyage from Sydney, New South Wales to Singapore.

After being discovered during the survey of the Gulf of Papua, New Guinea, the Fly River was named after the ship. Embarked during her voyages of exploration were the geologist and naturalist Joseph Jukes and the naturalist John MacGillivray.

Fly returned to the United Kingdom, arriving at Spithead on 19 June 1846 and proceeded to Plymouth to pay off. She was commissioned again on 14 October 1847 under Commander Richard Oliver, and was employed in surveying in the Pacific and New Zealand. After 4 years of work in the area she returned to the United Kingdom, arriving at Plymouth Sound on the evening of 4 December 1851 and paying off on 13 December.

== Fate ==
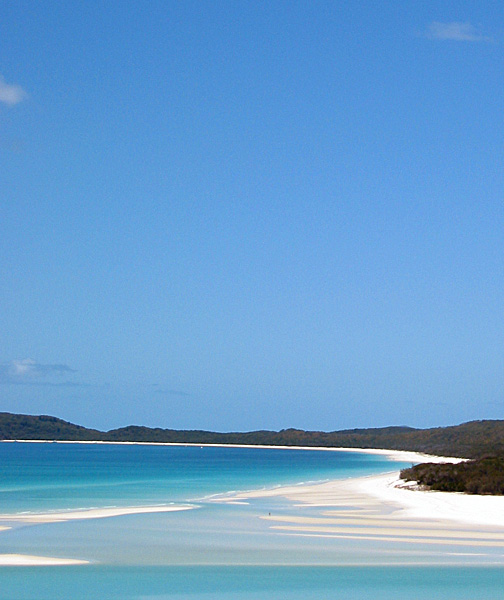
During the 1840s, Fly surveyed Whitsunday Island, pictured here

She was laid up as a coal hulk at Devonport in 1855. During this part of her career, she was renamed C2, and then C70. She was finally broken up in 1903.

== See also ==
- European and American voyages of scientific exploration
