= Eber Bunker =

American-born whaler

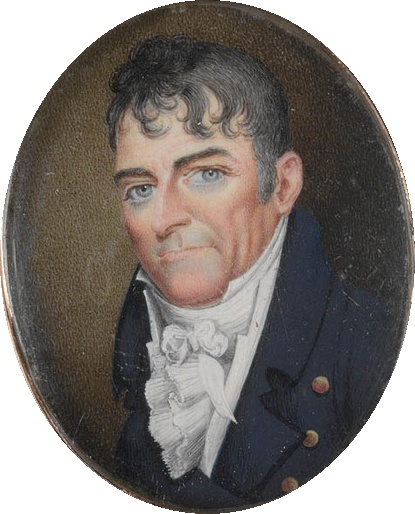
- Eber Bunker, c. 1810
- Born: 7 March 1761; Plymouth, Massachusetts
- Died: 27 September 1836 (aged 75); NSW, Australia
- Occupations: sea captain and pastoralist

Eber Bunker (1761–1836) was a sea captain and pastoralist, and he was born on 7 March 1761 at Plymouth, Massachusetts. He commanded one of the first vessels to go whaling and sealing off the coast of Australia. His parents were James Bunker and his wife Hannah, née Shurtleff.

== 1776–1786: Background ==
When England lost its American colonies in 1776 in the American Revolutionary War, it lost an important source of raw materials as well as its established dumping grounds for convicted criminals. Consequently, England saw an urgent need to replace these critical resources. Despite the enormous expenses associated with starting a new colony on a virtually uncharted continent in another hemisphere, England elected to establish a penal colony at Botany Bay under the leadership of Captain Arthur Phillip. This project was undertaken in part to relieve overcrowding in the English prisons, as well as to establish a new source for timber and other raw materials, and also to establish a deep water port in the South Pacific for Britain to expand its territories.

After 1776, the American whale oil market suffered because of the high tariffs placed by Britain on American oil. The resulting glut of oil on the American market stopped production there. Whale oil was in demand in Europe for lighting cities and lubricating the machines of the Industrial Revolution.

The sturdy, wide beamed whaling ships were well suited to serve as convict transports. For this reason, many American whalers migrated to London and served on British whaling ships transporting convicts to New South Wales. Among these was Captain Eber Bunker.

Bunker was already well-established in England by the time he was 25 years old. On 16 November 1786 at St. George-in-the-East, Middlesex, England, Eber Bunker married Margrett Thompson, daughter of Henry Thompson and his wife Isabella (née Collingwood, who was first cousin to Admiral Cuthbert Collingwood).

== 1791: Voyage to New South Wales as Master of William and Ann ==
In 1791, five of the whaling ships owned by Samuel Enderby & Sons were chartered as part of the Third Fleet of ships that brought settlers to Australia. Captain Eber Bunker, 30 years old at the time, was selected to be Master of one of these convict transport ships, the William and Ann. The William and Ann departed from Plymouth, England on 27 March 1791, with its cargo of 188 convicts and a company of soldiers. The ship arrived at Sydney Cove on 28 August 1791 with 181 surviving convicts.

== 1791: First whaling and sealing voyage in Australasia ==
Leaving Port Jackson on 24 October 1791, Bunker of the William and Ann and Captain Thomas Melvill of the Britannia led the first ever whaling expedition in Australian waters. Between them the two vessels took seven whales but a strong gale caused most of them to be cast adrift and the two ships returned to Port Jackson with only one whale each, which they processed on the shore. Bunker and William Raven led a second expedition to Dusky Sound in New Zealand before returning to England with seal skins, in addition to whale oil.

He next commanded the London whaler Pomona. That vessel departed London for the South Seas in December 1794 under the command of Captain Charles Clark. It was captured by a French privateer in February 1795. It was re-taken by the Susanna of Liverpool and taken to Cork, Ireland. Pomona departed Cork for the South Seas under Captain Bunker in June 1795. The vessel was reported off the coast of Chile in January 1796 and among the Galapagos Islands in November of that year. Pomona returned to London 18 August 1797, a full ship.

== 1799–1803: More whaling expeditions as Master of Albion ==
Bunker returned in 1799 to New South Wales in command of the 362-ton (bm) whaling ship, Albion. This ship was built in Deptford, England. Owned by Messrs Champion and registered in London, Albion was fitted with 10 guns and had a crew of 26. Bunker and Albion spent the next two winters whaling, first off the Australian coast and later the New Zealand coast. Bunker returned to Britain with a cargo of 155 barrels of whale oil.

In 1803, during another whaling voyage from England in Albion, Bunker was the first European to discover the Capricorn and Bunker Group of islands. This group of islands and reefs, situated astride the Tropic of Capricorn, is located at the southern end of the Great Barrier Reef (roughly 80 kilometers east of Gladstone, off the central coast of Queensland). Bunker named the southern group of islands after himself.

== 1803–1809: Land grants in New South Wales and death of first wife ==
Later in 1803, Governor King chartered Bunker and Albion to carry the first settlers, along with stores and cattle, to Risdon Cove on the Derwent River in Tasmania. As part of his compensation for this voyage, Bunker received a land grant of 400 acres (162 hectares), which he named Collingwood, on Georges River near Bankstown, immediately south of the future town site of the City of Liverpool (New South Wales).

In August 1806, after the voyage to Tasmania, he arrived in Sydney as master of the Elizabeth, bringing his wife Margrett and five children from England to live with him. The Bunker family home in Sydney was in the Rocks overlooking the harbor, at a place known as Bunker’s Hill.

Bunker's wife Margrett died in March 1808. Apparently, this did not slow Bunker down, as in May 1808 he sailed in the brig Pegasus for New Zealand, Tongatapu and New Caledonia in search of the Harrington, which had been stolen by convicts.

In the summer of 1809, Bunker conducted a sealing expedition off southern New Zealand in the Pegasus, where he charted Foveaux Strait and named Pegasus Island off Stewart Island; Pegasus was later renamed Codfish / Whenua Hou. William Stewart was first officer and made charts of the New Zealand coast, including Stewart Island, which was subsequently named after him. On his return Bunker took up a grant of 500 acres (202 hectares) at Cabramatta Creek, adjoining his Bankstown land. This he called Collingwood Dale.

== 1809-1818: Remarriage, establishment as a pastoralist, and more voyages ==
In 1809, Bunker sailed in command of the Venus from Bengal to Sydney. He married Margaret Macfarlane, widow of an officer of the East India Company. On his return he farmed on his Bankstown land, but his services as a mariner continued to be in demand.

Bunker built Collingwood House at Liverpool in 1810, and his family moved there the following year. Bunker contributed significantly to the development of the pastoral industry in New South Wales. After he was granted permission to send stock and shepherds to the south and west of Bargo and Keepit on the Namoi River, Bunker established a regular supply of fresh meat to the Government Stores.

In 1814 at Governor Macquarie's request he returned to England aboard the Seringapatam, which the American frigate Essex had captured, and which mutineers and prisoners of war had retaken at the Marquesas. In 1817 he sailed the American ship Enterprize to the sealing grounds and returned from Bengal in 1818 in the Dragon.

== 1821–1825: More land grants, more voyages, death of second wife, and final marriage ==
In 1821, Bunker was promised a grant of 600 acres (243 hectares) at Ravensworth on the Hunter River, and was given a permit to proceed to the country south and west of Bargo with 100 cattle and two servants. He then went to England to buy the Wellington. While he was away his second wife (Margaret) died, and on his return he married, on 28 April 1823, Ann, widow of William Minchin. In 1824–25 he made a final whaling voyage in the Alfred to the Santa Cruz Islands.

== 1828–1836: Final years and legacy ==
By 1828, Bunker held 1600 acres (648 hectares), of which 340 (138 hectares) were cleared. He died at Collingwood on 27 September 1836, aged 74, and was buried in the old Church of England cemetery at Liverpool. Once described by Governor Macquarie as 'a very able and expert Seaman... and of a Most respectable Character', he had been a leading member of the community in New South Wales. He has been called the 'father of Australian whaling'.

The Mitchell Library holds a portrait of Eber Bunker wearing a white waistcoat and white linen ruffled shirt each with stand collars, a white stock at neckline, and a navy blue wool double-breasted jacket with brass buttons titled Captain Eber Bunker, 1760–1836, The first of the Whalers, Arrived New South Wales 1791.

The Bunker Islets near Stewart Island in New Zealand were named after Bunker.

== See also ==
- History of Australia
- Whaling in Australia
