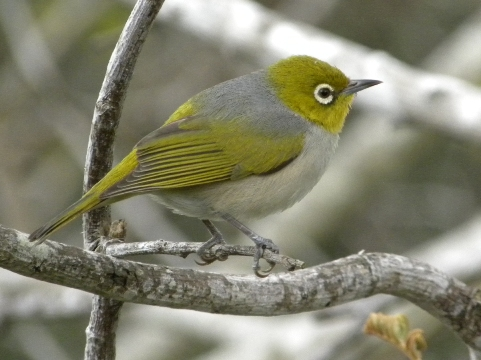

Scientific classification
- Kingdom: Animalia
- Phylum: Chordata
- Class: Aves
- Order: Passeriformes
- Family: Zosteropidae
- Genus: Zosterops
- Species: Z. lateralis
- Subspecies: Z. l. chlorocephalus

Trinomial name
- Zosterops lateralis chlorocephalus Campbell & White, 1910

Synonyms
- Zosterops chlorocephalus

= Capricorn silvereye =

Subspecies of bird

The Capricorn silvereye (Zosterops lateralis chlorocephalus), also known as the Capricorn white-eye or green-headed white-eye, is a small greenish bird in the Zosteropidae or white-eye family. It is a subspecies of the silvereye that occurs on islands off the coast of Queensland in north-eastern Australia, and which is sometimes considered to be a full species.

== Description ==
The Capricorn silvereye is the only bird endemic to the Great Barrier Reef. It was first described by Archibald Campbell and Samuel White in The Emu from specimens collected during an expedition by the Royal Australasian Ornithologists Union to the Capricorn Group in October 1910. They wrote:

Zosterops were numerous, and appeared to breed on the islands, judging by a few old nests. As at some of our more southern camps, it was delightful to listen to the subdued chorus of the birds' sweet warbling songs at daybreak. Regularly on Masthead they commenced to warble from 10 to 5 minutes before 5 o’clock.

White-eyes were observed in great numbers on North-West and Tryon Islands, where, also, the nesting season had not yet commenced. Several skins were procured – the first by Mr J.W. Mellor.

From a critical examination of these skins it is at once noticeable that they are not referable to Z. caerulescens, but are more in agreement with the description of Quoy and Gaimard’s Z. westernensis. Should further research prove them different, we venture to suggest the name Z. chlorocephalus, or Green-headed White-eye (on account of the "clean-cut" markings of that colour), the following being the general description: – Male. – Distinct ring of silvery-white round the eye, succeeded by a black line under the eye; head, mantle, upper wing coverts, and upper tail coverts bright olive-green; back grey, blending into the greenish mantle; wings and tail dark brown, the primaries and tail feathers edged with bright olive-green; chin, throat, and under tail coverts greenish-yellow; rest of the under surface grayish-blue, darkest on the chest, and approaching grayish-white on the abdomen. Bill dark brown, the basal half of the lower mandible lighter coloured; tarsus dark grey. Dimensions in inches: – Length, 4 ¾ [121 mm]; wing, 2 11/16 [68 mm]; bill, 7/16 [11 mm]; tail, 2 [51 mm]; tarsus, 11/16 [17 mm].

The sexes of the Capricorn silvereye are visually indistinguishable. The subspecies is substantially larger than Z. l. cornwalli, the taxon occupying the mainland coast opposite the Capricorn and Bunker Islands, from which it is derived, and from which it has been separated for not more than four millennia, or about 500 generations, following its colonisation of the islands. The bird has been used as a model to investigate the hypothesis that passerines on islands have a tendency to evolve larger forms. The lectotype is an unsexed specimen from North West Island, held by the American Museum of Natural History (AMNH 700956).

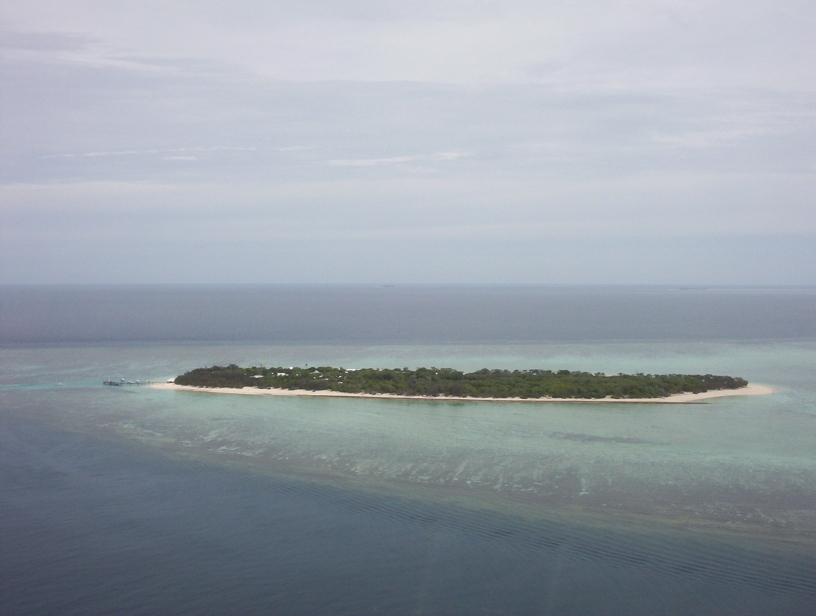
Aerial view of 16-ha Heron Island from the south, site of a long-term study of the Capricorn silvereye

== Distribution and habitat ==
The Capricorn silvereye is restricted to wooded coral cays of the Capricorn and Bunker Group at the southern end of the Great Barrier Reef in Queensland. It is the only passerine species to breed regularly on 16 ha Heron Island. There it has been the subject of long-term biological studies by the University of Queensland which operates the Heron Island Research Station, with the island population having been continuously and accurately monitored since 1965.

Its habitat comprises typical cay vegetation of the region, mainly of Pisonia grandis forest forming a closed canopy up to 15 m in height, with areas of Casuarina equisetifolia, Silky Celtis, Sweet Sandpaper Fig, Octopus Bush and associated shrubs, as well as areas around human habitation, such as the Heron Island resort.

== Behaviour ==
=== Breeding ===
Studies on Heron Island have shown that Capricorn silvereyes mate for life with the same partner. They are not only socially, but also genetically monogamous birds, and their territories are actively defended by both members of the pair during the breeding season. Breeding is seasonal, beginning in the dry season of winter and spring (August–November), with the peak of the first clutch laying occurring in September–October and the chicks hatching when early wet season rains have stimulated the availability of insects. With the onset of the nesting season, males start roosting by themselves and singing from a high, but often concealed, perch at dawn as they establish, or reestablish, their territory. The territory defended by a pair is usually restricted to the tree in which the nest is built, and its immediate vicinity.

Beginning as early as August, nests are built in dense foliage, usually in a terminal fork of a Pisonia branch, though several other plants may be used. The cup-shaped nest is constructed by both members of the pair from dry grasses and other vegetable material, as well as cobwebs and various kinds of anthropogenic debris such as toilet paper, fishing line and human hair. Nests may take up to a week or more to complete. The usual clutch is of three pale blue eggs, with an incubation period of 12–14 days. The hatchlings are altricial and nidicolous and are fed by both parents. The chicks fledge at 12–14 days old and leave the nest shortly afterwards, still being fed by their parents for about another two weeks. In a study of the 1969/70 breeding season, the mean number of fledglings produced per nest was 1.9. Second and third clutches extend breeding through much of the wet season into January.

=== Feeding ===
The silvereyes forage in small flocks, or sometimes singly when feeding young. They are not confined to their breeding territories, though the adults forage near them from the ground to the forest canopy, often around concentrated food sources. They consume a wide range of plant and animal food, including insects and other small invertebrates, fruit and nectar. The sweet sandpaper fig is an important source of food on Heron Island.

=== Vocalisation ===
The song of the Capricorn silvereye is a warble containing a series of separate notes; it is complex, with a well-organised hierarchy of syllables and sequences. A bird's song repertoire is established by its first breeding season. Singing takes place in the breeding season during a 20-minute dawn chorus by all territorial males; it is also heard occasionally throughout the day. The song rate averages six to seven songs per minute during the dawn chorus; each song is about five seconds long and contains an average of 16 notes.

== Population and mortality ==
A study of population dynamics on 16 ha Heron Island between 1979 and 1993, during which over 90% of the birds were individually colour-banded, recorded that the population there fluctuated between 225 and 483 individuals. Four cyclones during that period caused substantial mortality. There was also evidence of the effects of density dependence in the size of the adult population, and with fledgling survival decreasing with the numbers of birds attempting to breed.

The main cause of the total loss of nestlings from a nest is faulty nest construction leading to tilting. Early dry season nests can suffer damage from the loss of supporting leaves in the tree canopy, while late season nests are at risk from heavy rain and strong winds. Young fledglings are vulnerable to predation by eastern reef egrets in the trees, and by silver gulls and buff-banded rails on the ground.
