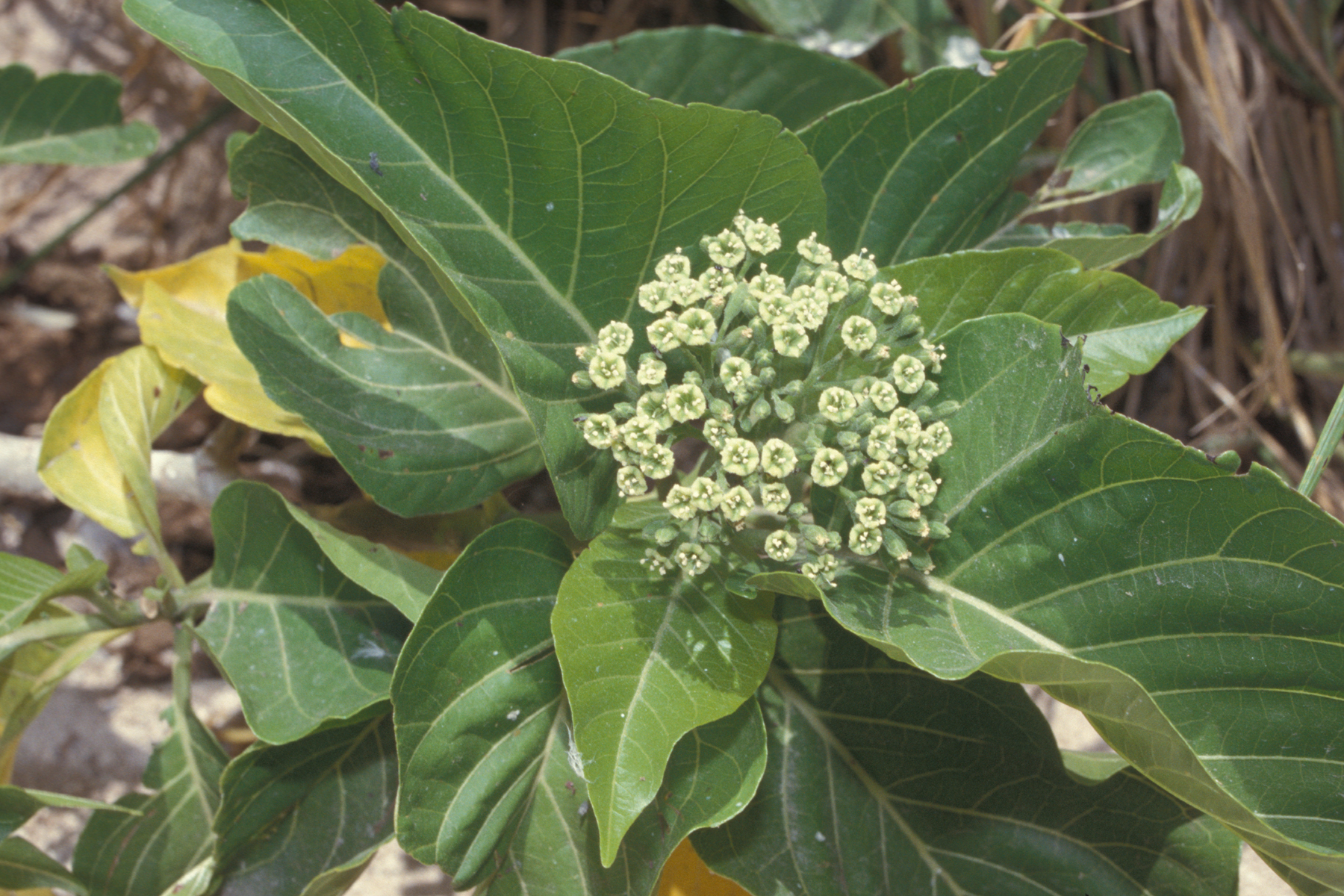

Scientific classification
- Kingdom: Plantae
- Clade: Tracheophytes
- Clade: Angiosperms
- Clade: Eudicots
- Order: Caryophyllales
- Family: Nyctaginaceae
- Genus: Pisonia
- Species: P. grandis

Binomial name
- Pisonia grandis R.Br.

Synonyms
- Calpidia forsteriana (Endl. ex Walp.) Heimerl; Calpidia macrophylla Bojer; Ceodes forsteriana (Endl. ex Walp.) Skottsb.; Ceodes grandis (R.Br.) D.Q.Lu; Cordia olitoria Blanco; Pisonia alba Span.; Pisonia forsteriana Endl. ex Walp.; Pisonia inermis G.Forst.; Pisonia macrophylla Link; Pisonia macrophylla Choisy; Pisonia malabarica Choisy; Pisonia morindifolia R.Br.; Pisonia olitoria (Blanco) Zoll.; Pisonia procera Bertero ex Guill.; Pisonia sylvestris Teijsm. & Binn.; Pisonia viscosa Balf.f.; Timeroyea canalensis S.Moore; Plectronia macconnelii Horne ex Baker

= Pisonia grandis =

Species of flowering plant

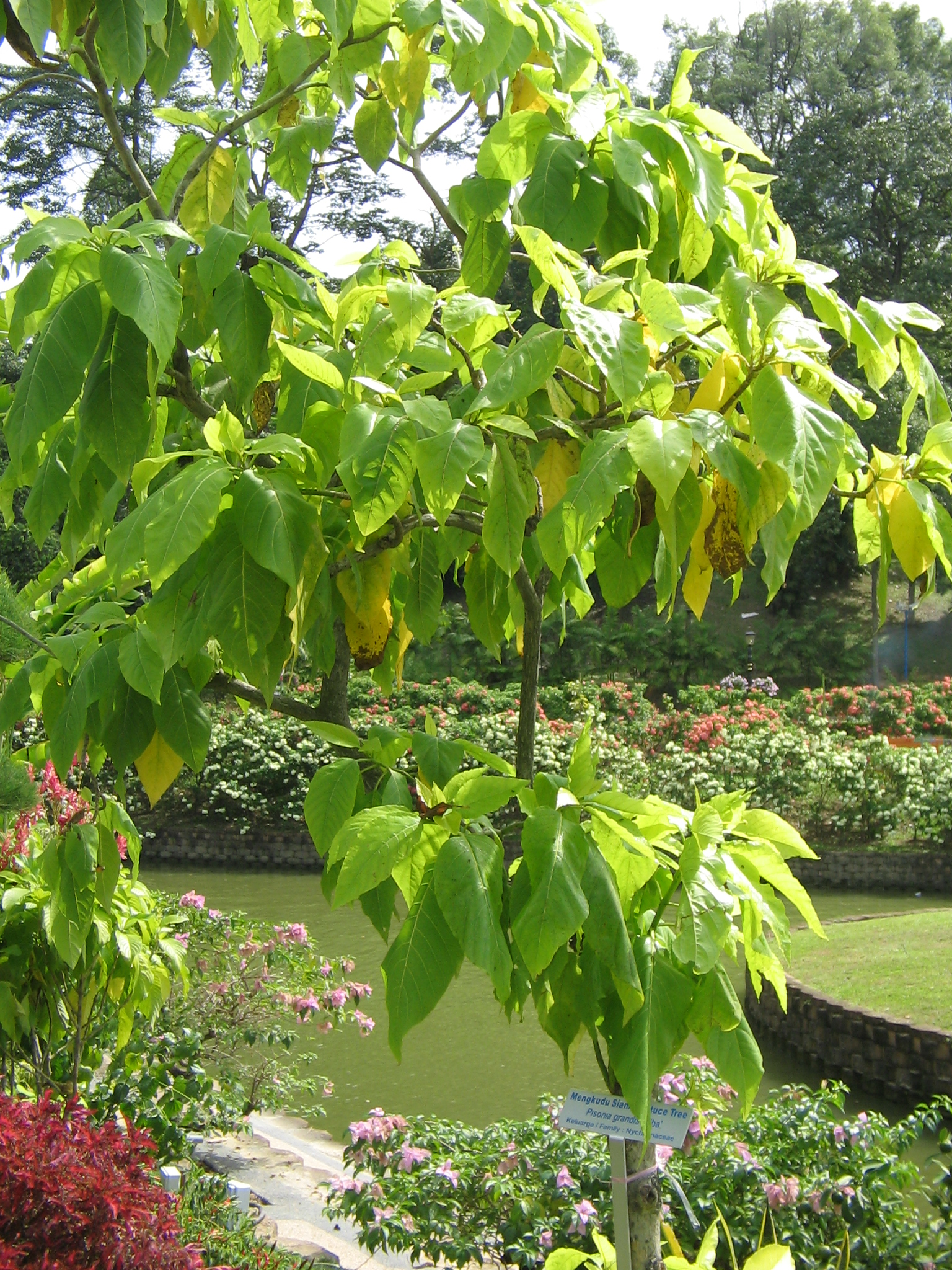
Pisonia grandis growing in an urban park in Malaysia.

Pisonia grandis, the grand devil's-claws, is a species of flowering tree in the Bougainvillea family, Nyctaginaceae.

== Description ==
The tree has broad, thin leaves, smooth bark and bears clusters of green sweet-smelling flowers that mature into sticky barbed seeds.

Dispersal occurs when seeds stick to bird feathers. Vegetative reproduction frequently results when fallen branches sprout or basal shoots develop into new trees.

== Distribution ==
Pisonia trees are distributed throughout the coral cays of the Indian and Pacific Oceans. The species often dominates mature coral cay vegetation, growing in dense, thick strands up to 20 m (66 ft) tall. Pisonia wood is rather weak and soft and decays rapidly when the trees fall.

Pisonia forests are a common nesting site for seabirds. One of the best remaining Pisonia forests can be found on Palmyra Atoll.

St. Pierre Island, Farquhar Group, was once covered by a Pisonia grandis forest. This forest disappeared after guano mining between 1906 and 1972. The natural vegetation was destroyed in order to scrape the guano and the island's landscape became barren.

== Uses ==
The leaves are traditionally used as a leaf vegetable in some countries. They were part of the traditional Maldivian cuisine in dishes such as mas huni.

== In mythology ==
The flower is known as the ꦮꦶꦗꦪꦏꦸꦱꦸꦩ wijayakusuma ('victorious flower') in Javanese; a population found on a rock not far from Nusa Kambangan off Java is the subject of a legend where a prince of Mataram must be able to procure a flower from this islet as a measure of strength and proof of legitimacy.
