= Cay =

Small island formed on the surface of a coral reef

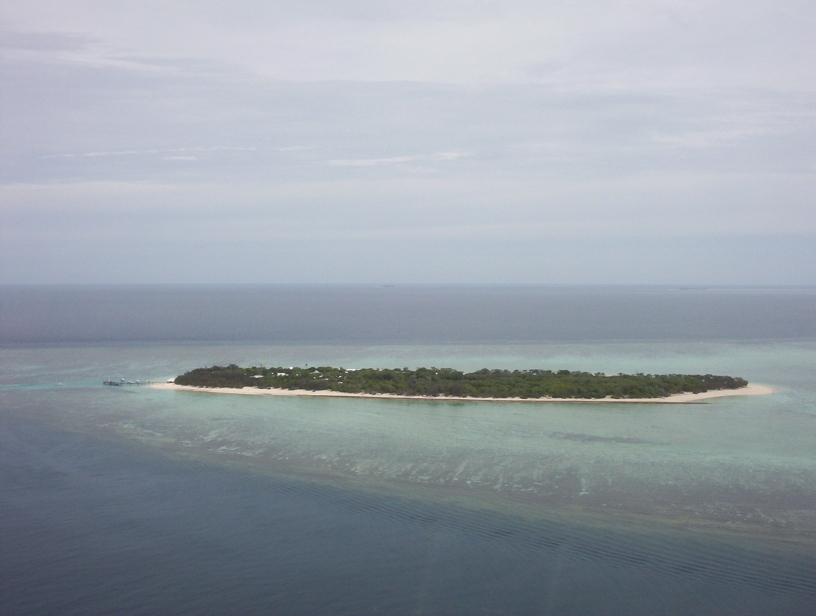
Heron Island, Australia

A cay (/kiː, keɪ/ KEE), also spelled caye or key, is a small, low-elevation, sandy island on the surface of a coral reef. Cays occur in tropical environments throughout the Pacific, Atlantic, and Indian oceans, including in the Caribbean and on the Great Barrier Reef and Belize Barrier Reef.

== Etymology ==
The Lucayan word for "island", cairi, became cayo in Spanish and "cay" /ˈkiː/ in English (spelled "key" in American English).

== Formation and composition ==
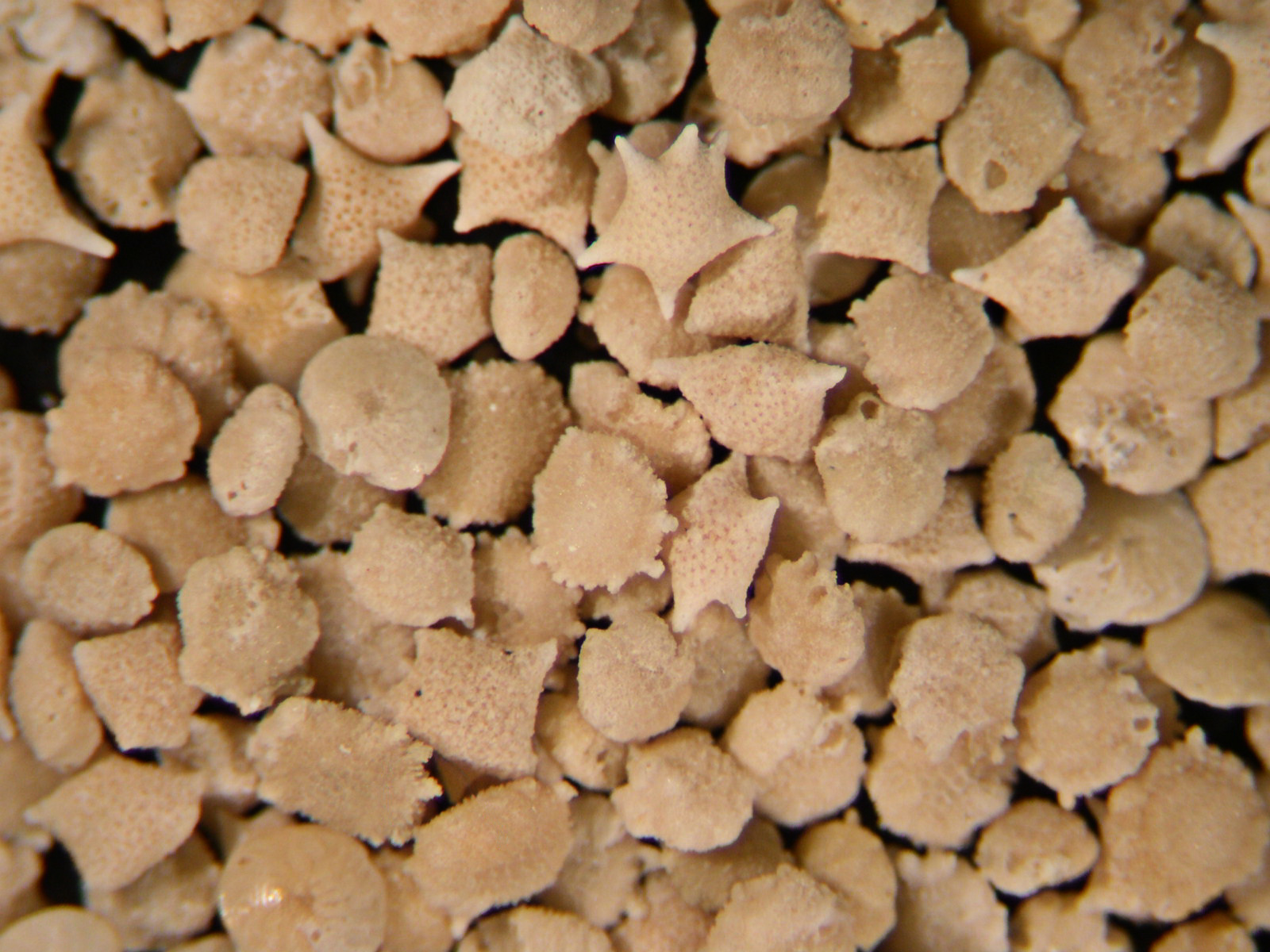
Cay sand under an optical microscope

A cay forms when ocean currents transport loose sediment across the surface of a reef to where the current slows or converges with another current, releasing its sediment load. Gradually, layers of deposited sediment build up on the reef surface – a depositional node. Such nodes occur in windward or leeward areas of reefs, where flat surfaces sometimes rise around an emergent outcrop of old reef or beach rock.

The island resulting from sediment accumulation is made up almost entirely of the skeletal remains of plants and animals – biogenic sediment – from the surrounding reef ecosystems. If the accumulated sediments are predominantly biogenic sand, then the island is called a cay; if they are predominantly gravel, geological sediments, the island is called a motu.

Cay sediments are largely composed of calcium carbonate (CaCO_{3}), primarily of aragonite, calcite, and high-magnesium calcite. They are produced by myriad plants (e.g., coralline algae, species of the green algae Halimeda) and animals (e.g., coral, molluscs, foraminifera). Small amounts of silicate sediment are also contributed by sponges and other creatures. Over time, soil and vegetation may develop on a cay surface, assisted by the deposition of sea bird guano.

== Development and stability ==
A range of physical, biological and chemical influences determines the ongoing development or erosion of cay environments. These influences include:

- the extent of reef surface sand accumulations,
- changes in ocean waves, currents, tides, sea levels, and weather conditions,
- the shape of the underlying reef,
- the types and abundance of carbonate producing biota and other organisms such as binders, bioeroders, and bioturbators (creatures that bind, erode, and mix sediments) living in surrounding reef ecosystems.

Significant changes in cays and their surrounding ecosystems can result from natural phenomena such as severe El Niño–Southern Oscillation (ENSO) cycles. Also, tropical cyclones can either help build up or tear down these islands.

There is much debate and concern over the future stability of cays in the face of growing human populations and pressures on reef ecosystems, and predicted climate changes and sea level rise. There is also debate around whether these islands are relict features that effectively stopped expanding two thousand years ago during the late Holocene or, as recent research suggests, they are still growing, with significant new accumulation of reef sediments.

Understanding the potential for change in the sediment sources and supply of cay beaches with environmental change is an important key to predicting their stability. Debate around the future of cays has resulted in a consensus that these island environments are very complex and fairly fragile.

== Examples ==
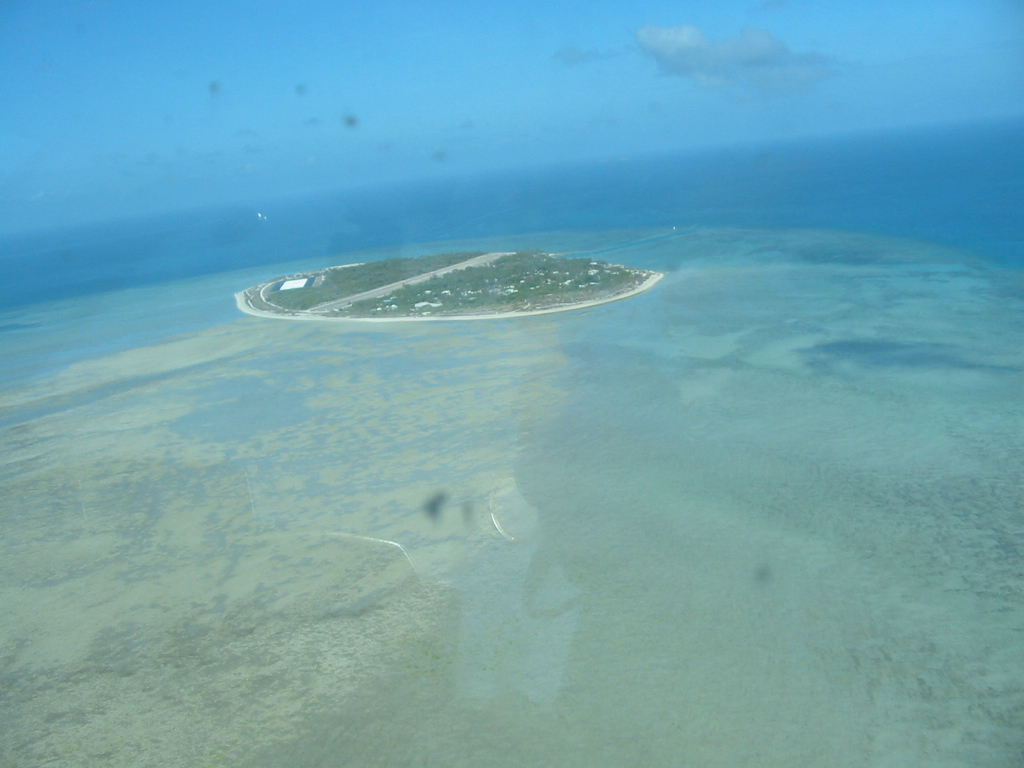
Warraber Island, Torres Strait

Examples of cays include:

- A few of the Florida Keys, such as Sand Key, are "cays" as defined above. (Most of the Florida Keys are exposed ancient coral reefs, and the oolite beds that formed behind reefs.)
- Heron Island, Australia, a coral cay on the southern Great Barrier Reef
- Prickly Pear Cays, Anguilla
- Rama Cay, Nicaragua
- Tobacco Caye, Dangriga, Belize
- Warraber Island, Torres Strait, Australia,
- Elbow Cays, Bahamas
- Great Goat Island, Jamaica
- Ocean Cay, Bahamas
- The Cays of Morrocoy, Venezuela

== See also ==
- Archipelago
