= Environmental threats to the Great Barrier Reef =

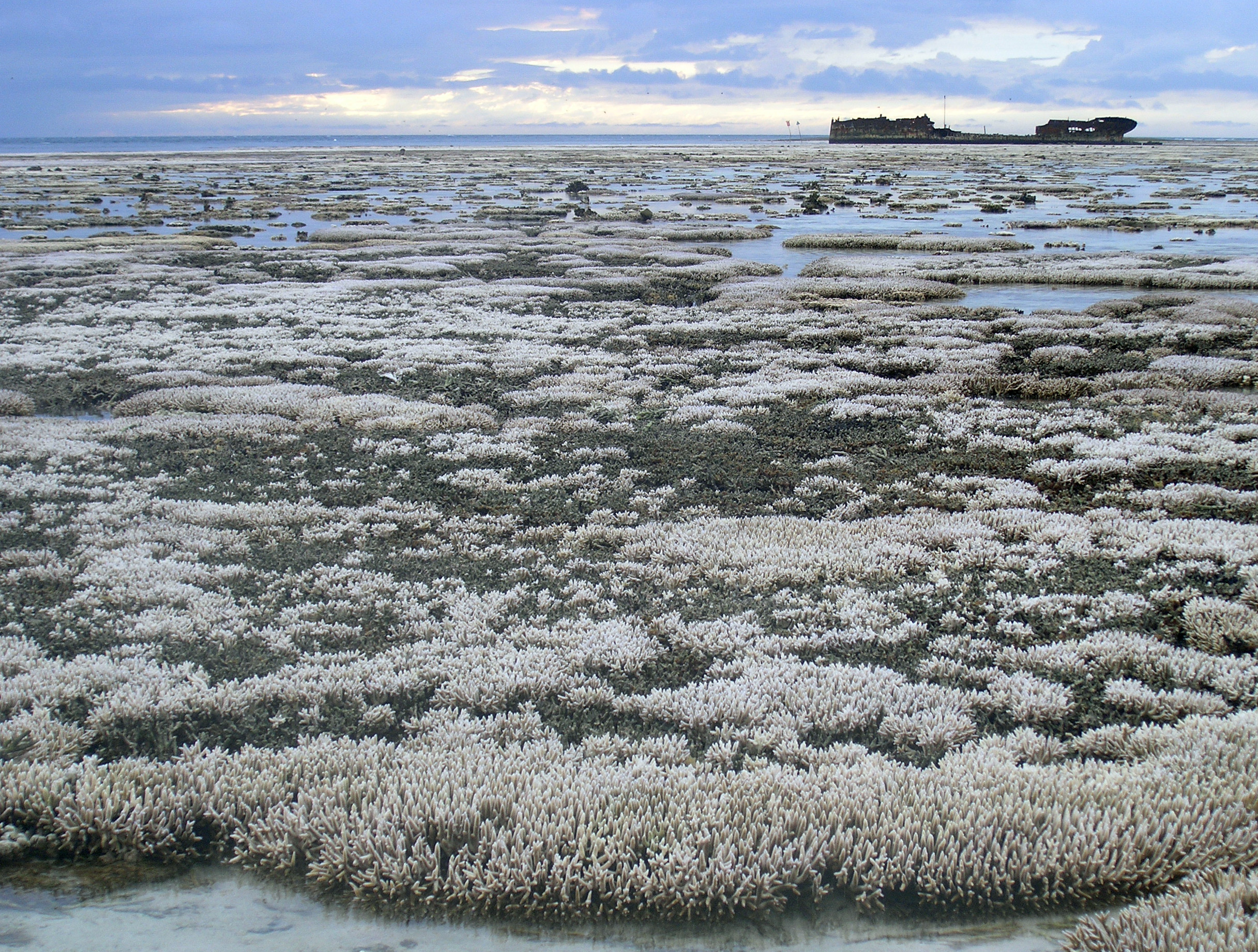
A major coral bleaching event took place on this part of the Great Barrier Reef

The Great Barrier Reef is the world's largest reef systems, stretching along the East coast of Australia from the northern tip down at Cape York to the town of Bundaberg, is composed of roughly 2,900 individual reefs and 940 islands and cays that stretch for 2,300 kilometres (1,616 mi) and cover an area of approximately 344,400 square kilometres (133,000 sq mi). The reef is located in the Coral Sea, off the coast of Queensland in northeast Australia. A large part of the reef is protected by the Great Barrier Reef Marine Park.

A 2014 report of the Australian Government's Great Barrier Reef Marine Park Authority (GBRMPA) says that climate change is the most significant environmental threat to the Great Barrier Reef. Other major environmental pressures listed are decreased water quality from land-based runoff, impacts from coastal development, and some persistent impacts from fishing activities. The reef is also threatened by storms, coral bleaching and ocean acidification. The 2014 report also shows that, while numerous marine life species have recovered after previous declines, the strength of the dugong population is continuing to decline. Terry Hughes, Federation Fellow, ARC Centre of Excellence for Coral Reef Studies at James Cook University, wrote in a 14 August 2014 Conversation piece that harmful government policies and ongoing conflicts of interest over mining royalties are risks of an equivalent magnitude. Reef scientists Jon Day, Bob Pressey, Jon Brodie, and Hughes have stated that the "cumulative effects of many combined impacts" is the real issue.

In a Conversation article, Mathieu Mongin, a biogeochemical modeller at CSIRO and colleagues mapped parts of the Great Barrier Reef that are most exposed to ocean acidification. This map of pH on the Great Barrier Reef presents the exposure to ocean acidification on each of the 3,581 reefs, providing managers with the information they need to tailor management to individual reefs. The Great Barrier Reef is not a singular reef nor a physical barrier that prevents exchange between reefs; it is a mixture of thousands of productive reefs and shallow areas lying on a continental shelf with complex oceanic circulation.

In March 2022, UNESCO launched a monitoring mission to assess the impact of pollution, fishing, climate change and coral bleaching. The report concluded that the Great Barrier Reef should be included on the list of World Heritage in Danger, which would probably have had an impact on tourism. In May 2023, after years of warnings from UNESCO, Australian Environment Minister Tanya Plibersek promised in a letter to UNESCO Director Audrey Azoulay a "combined investment of A$4.4 billion" to protect the reef. In the letter, Australia committed to following UNESCO's recommendations, creating no-fishing zones in one third of the site by the end of 2024, completely banning gillnetting by 2027 and meeting targets for improving water quality by 2025. The Albanese government has pledged to set targets for reducing CO_{2} emissions, to align with the objective of limiting global temperature rise to 1.5 °C.

== History ==
In 1967, efforts began to conserve the Great Barrier Reef. It was proposed to mine lime from Ellison Reef, but surveys showed that the reef supported a diverse community of corals and fish.

The Australian and Queensland Governments committed to act in partnership in 2007 to protect the reef, and water quality monitoring programmes were implemented. However, the World Wildlife Fund criticised the slow progress of the governments, raising a concern that as many as 700 reefs continued to be at risk from sediment runoff.

The World Heritage Committee has raised concerns about the Great Barrier Reef since 2010. The Australian government then outlined further action after the World Heritage Committee (WHC) called for the completion of a strategic assessment of the Reef area in 2011. The committee also urged the government to use the assessment data to develop a long-term plan for protecting the "Outstanding Universal Value" of the reef, which is the basis for its World Heritage listing. Again, criticisms emerged from the expert community—due to vague quantitative targets, the absence of clear, specific strategies, and no mention of the implications of climate change—but the significant efforts of both state and federal governments addressed key recommendations from the WHC.

A 2012 UNESCO report, published by the WHC, then criticised the government's management of the Great Barrier Reef, warning that the area could be downgraded to a world heritage site "in danger" unless major changes were implemented. The report expressed "extreme concern" at the rapid rate of coastal development, highlighting the construction of liquefied natural gas plants at Gladstone and Curtis Island, and recommended that thorough assessments are made before any new developments that could affect the reef are approved. UNESCO specifically recommended no new port development in Abbot Point, Gladstone, Hay Point, Mackay and Townsville.

Minister for Foreign Affairs Julie Bishop informed the Australian media that she would use climate change talks, held in Lima, Peru, in December 2014, to avoid the WHC—consisting of experts from 20 nations—applying the "in danger" listing in 2015. Bishop believed that "no justification" existed for the downgrading:

It would send a message around the world that even if you meet all of the criteria set out by the world heritage committee, there is still a risk that they will place an area on the in-danger list ... It [downgrading] would have significant implications for Australia but it would also set a very dangerous precedent for countries who don't have the opportunity to take the action that Australia has.

To avoid the Great Barrier Reef being listed as "in danger", the Queensland Government introduced the Ports Bill 2014 on 25 November 2014. The Bill seeks to restrict further port development along the coast to Brisbane and four "Priority Port Development Areas", with the latter including four ports identified by the WHC in its 2012 report. The Bill also restricts dredging over a decade-long period, with the exception of priority ports. Additionally, a long-term sustainability plan and the expansion of water-quality activities were introduced by state and federal governments, and their partner agencies.

However, in response to the Ports Bill, University of Queensland (UQ) academics said on 19 December 2014 that, although the issues are "not insurmountable", "the health of the reef is still declining and consequently more needs to be done." Australian Marine Conservation Society (AMCS) Great Barrier Reef campaign director Felicity Wishart was more damning and stated in a press release:

The new Ports Bill fails to rule out any currently proposed new dredging, the dumping of dredge spoil in the Reef's waters and is silent on maintenance dredging across the region. The millions of tonnes of dredging and dumping for mega port developments that are in the pipeline will be able to go ahead under the Bill. Despite the establishment of four Priority Port Development Areas along the Reef (Townsville, Abbot Point, Mackay/Hay Point and Gladstone), the Bill will still allow port expansion in Cairns. This fails to meet the recommendation by the World Heritage Committee that no new port developments be permitted outside of the existing port areas. The Bill contains no protections for the most northern section of the Reef or the Fitzroy Delta, and it does nothing to improve water quality in Reef waters, all matters which the World Heritage Committee wants action on.

The Reef 2050 plan began in 2015 and was updated in 2021 to focus on the current issues the Great Barrier Reef is experiencing prioritizing resilience. The Australian government, Queensland government, the Great Barrier Reef Marine Park Authority, Australian Institute of Marine Science (AIMS), and the Great Barrier Reef Foundation are all working together and have put 5 billion dollars towards protection efforts. This includes reducing the impact of the ports, phase out gill-net fishing by 2027, net free fishing zones, beginning the Queensland Government Sustainable Fisheries Strategy, strengthening regulations, and reducing impact of vegetation clearing. UNESCO considers that the Reef 2050 Long-Term Sustainability Plan has been effective, noting that progress had been made to reduce agricultural runoff sediments.

== Water quality ==
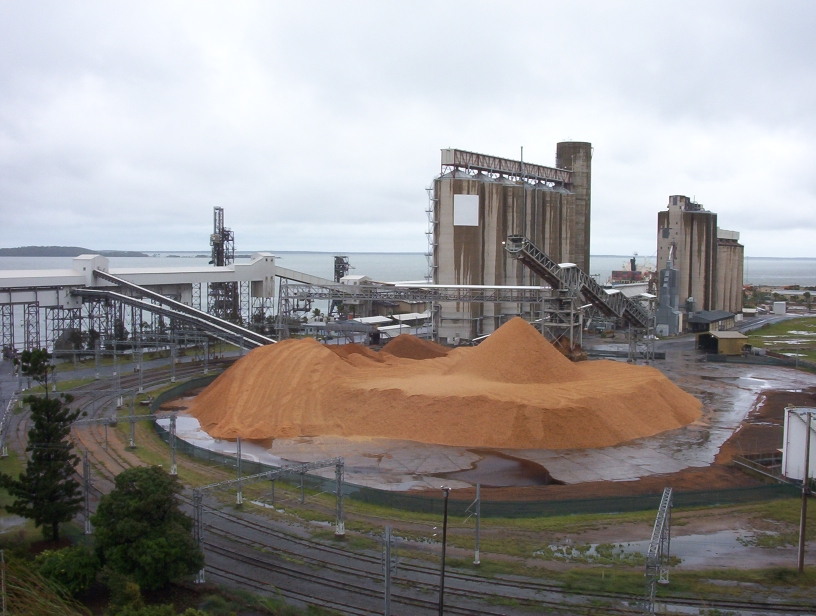
Storage Silos on the Gladstone waterfront, an industrial area in the water catchment area

Water quality was first identified as a threat to the Great Barrier Reef in 1989. Thirty "major rivers" and hundreds of small streams comprise the Great Barrier Reef catchment area, which covers 423,000 square kilometres (163,000 sq mi) of land. Queensland has several major urban centers on the coast including Cairns, Townsville, Mackay, Rockhampton and the industrial city of Gladstone. Dredging in the Port of Gladstone is raising concern after dead and diseased fish where found in the harbor. Cairns and Townsville are the largest of the coastal cities, with populations of approximately 150,000 each.

There are many major water quality variables affecting coral reef health including water temperature, salinity, nutrients, suspended sediment concentrations, and pesticides. The species in the Great Barrier Reef area are adapted to tolerable variations in water quality however when critical thresholds are exceeded they may be adversely impacted. River discharges are the single biggest source of nutrients, providing significant pollution of the Reef during tropical flood events with over 90% of this pollution being sourced from farms. When the 2019 Townsville flood waters reached the Great Barrier Reef, the flood plumes covered a large area of corals, even reaching 60 km out to sea, however water quality analysis showed damage to the outer reef from the flooding was less than previously feared.

As of 1995, water visibility had decreased to 10 metres.

Due to the range of human uses made of the water catchment area adjacent to the Great Barrier Reef, some 700 of the 3,000 reefs are within a risk zone where water quality has declined due to the naturally acidic sediment and chemical runoff from farming. Coastal development and the loss of coastal wetlands—the latter acts as natural filter—are also major factors From mid 2012 to mid 2016, 596,000 hectares of forest in the catchment zone was cleared.

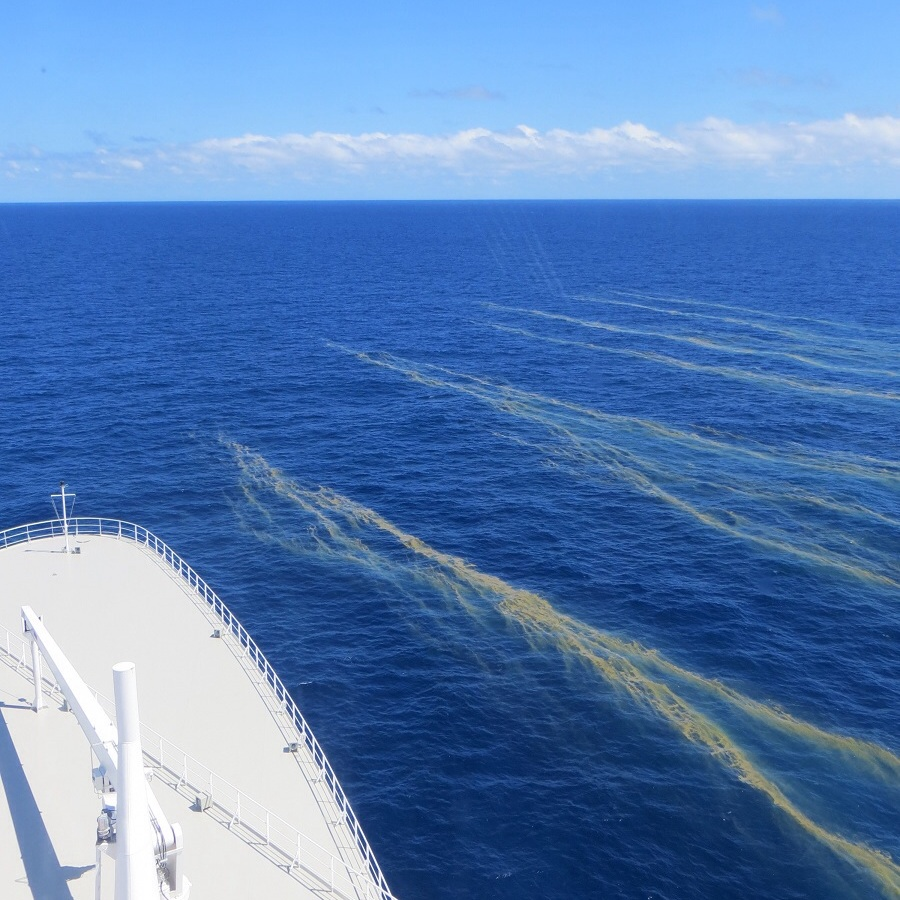
Trichodesmium bloom off the Great Barrier Reef

Industries in the water catchment area are cotton growing, comprising approximately 262 km^{2} (101 sq mi); 340 dairy farms with an average area of 2 km^{2} (0.77 sq mi) each, 158 km^{2} (61 sq mi) cattle grazing, 288 km^{2} (111 sq mi) horticulture including banana growing, sugarcane farming, and cropping of approximately 8,000 km^{2} (3,100 sq mi) wheat, 1,200 km^{2} (460 sq mi) barley, and 6,000 to 7000 km^{2} sorghum and maize. Fertiliser use in the cotton, dairy, beef, horticulture and sugar industries is essential to ensure productivity and profitability. However, fertiliser and byproducts from sugar cane harvesting methods form a component of surface runoff into the Great Barrier Reef lagoon.

The principal agricultural activity in the wet tropics is sugar cane farming, while cattle grazing is the primary industry in the dry tropics regions. Both are considered significant threats to high water quality. Copper, a common industrial pollutant in the waters of the Great Barrier Reef, has been shown to interfere with the development of coral polyps.

Flood plumes are flooding events associated with higher levels of nitrogen and phosphorus. In February 2007, due to a monsoonal climate system, plumes of sediment runoff have been observed reaching to the out most regions of the reef.

Runoff is especially concerning in the region south of Cairns, as it receives over 3,000 millimetres (120 in) of rain per year and the reefs are less than 30 kilometres (19 mi) away from the coastline. Farm run off is polluted as a result of overgrazing and excessive fertilizer and pesticide use. Mud pollution has increased by 800% and inorganic nitrogen pollution by 3,000% since the introduction of European farming practices on the Australian landscape. This pollution has been linked to a range of very significant risks to the reef system, including intensified outbreaks of the coral-eating crown-of-thorns starfish which contributed to a loss of 66% of live coral cover on sampled reefs in 2000.

It is thought that the mechanism behind excess nutrients affecting the reefs is due to increased light and oxygen competition from algae, but unless herbivory is unusually low, this will not create a phase shift from the Great Barrier Reef being primarily made up of coral to being primarily made up of algae.

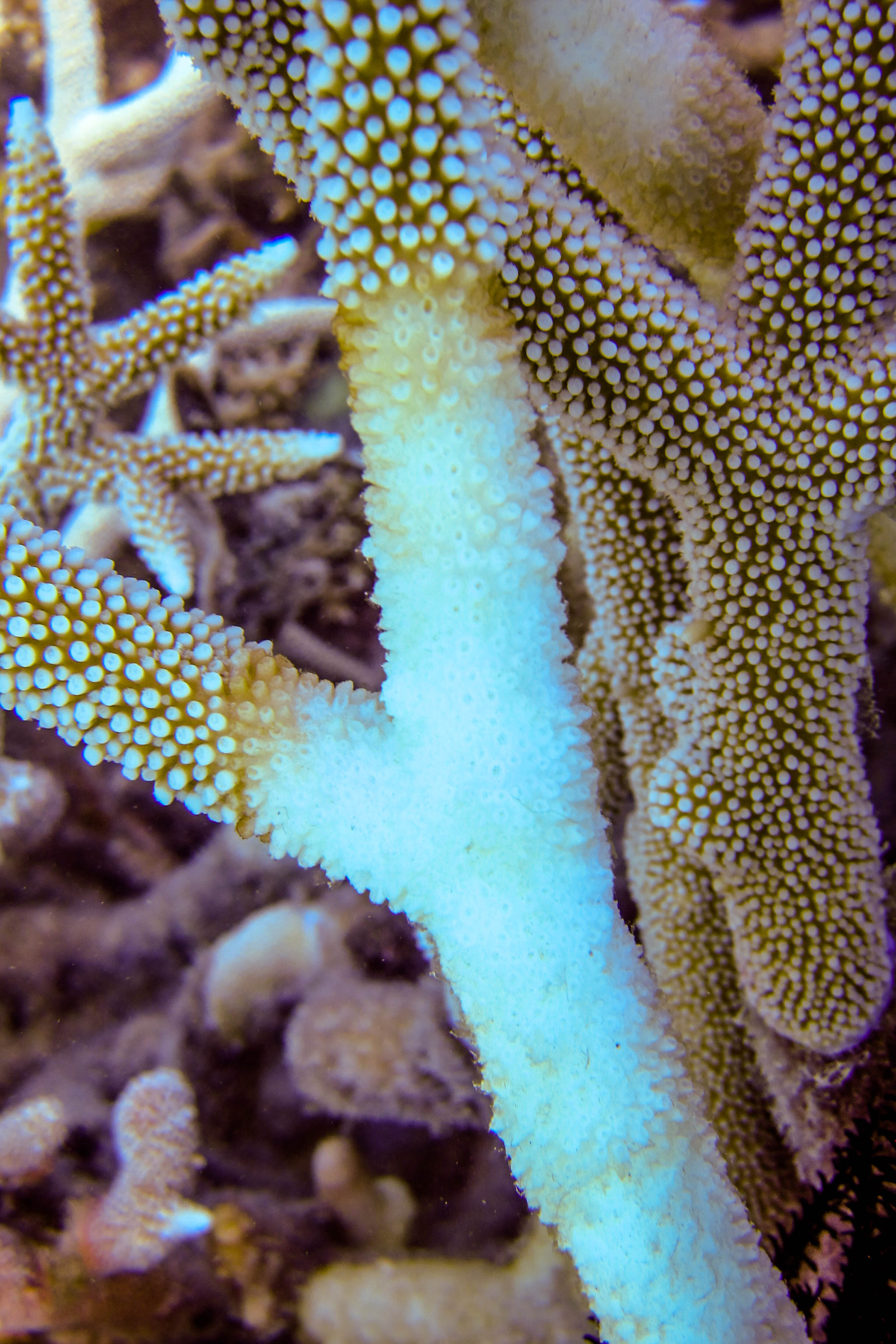
Acropora with brown band disease, Lizard Island

It has been suggested that poor water quality due to excess nutrients encourages the spread of infectious diseases among corals. In general, the Great Barrier Reef is considered to have low incidences of coral diseases. Skeletal Eroding Band, a disease of bony corals caused by the protozoan Halofolliculina corallasia, affects 31 species of corals from six families on the reef. The long-term monitoring program has found an increase in incidences of coral disease in the period 1999–2002, although they dispute the claim that on the Great Barrier Reef, coral diseases are caused by anthropogenic pollution.

Elevated nutrient concentrations result in a range of impacts on coral communities and under extreme conditions can result in a collapse. It also affects coral by promoting phytoplankton growth which increases the number of filter-feeding organisms that compete for space. Excessive inputs of sediment from land to coral can lead to reef destruction through burial, disruption of recruitment success, or deleterious community shifts. Sediments affect coral by smothering them when particles settle out, reducing light availability and potentially reducing photosynthesis and growth. Coral reefs exist in seawater salinities from 25 to 42%. Salinity impacts to corals are increased by other flood-related stresses.

While runoff from farms has historically been considered the main water quality stressor to the Great Barrier Reef, pollutants are leaching out of underground aquifers into the reef system.

=== Pollution from mining ===
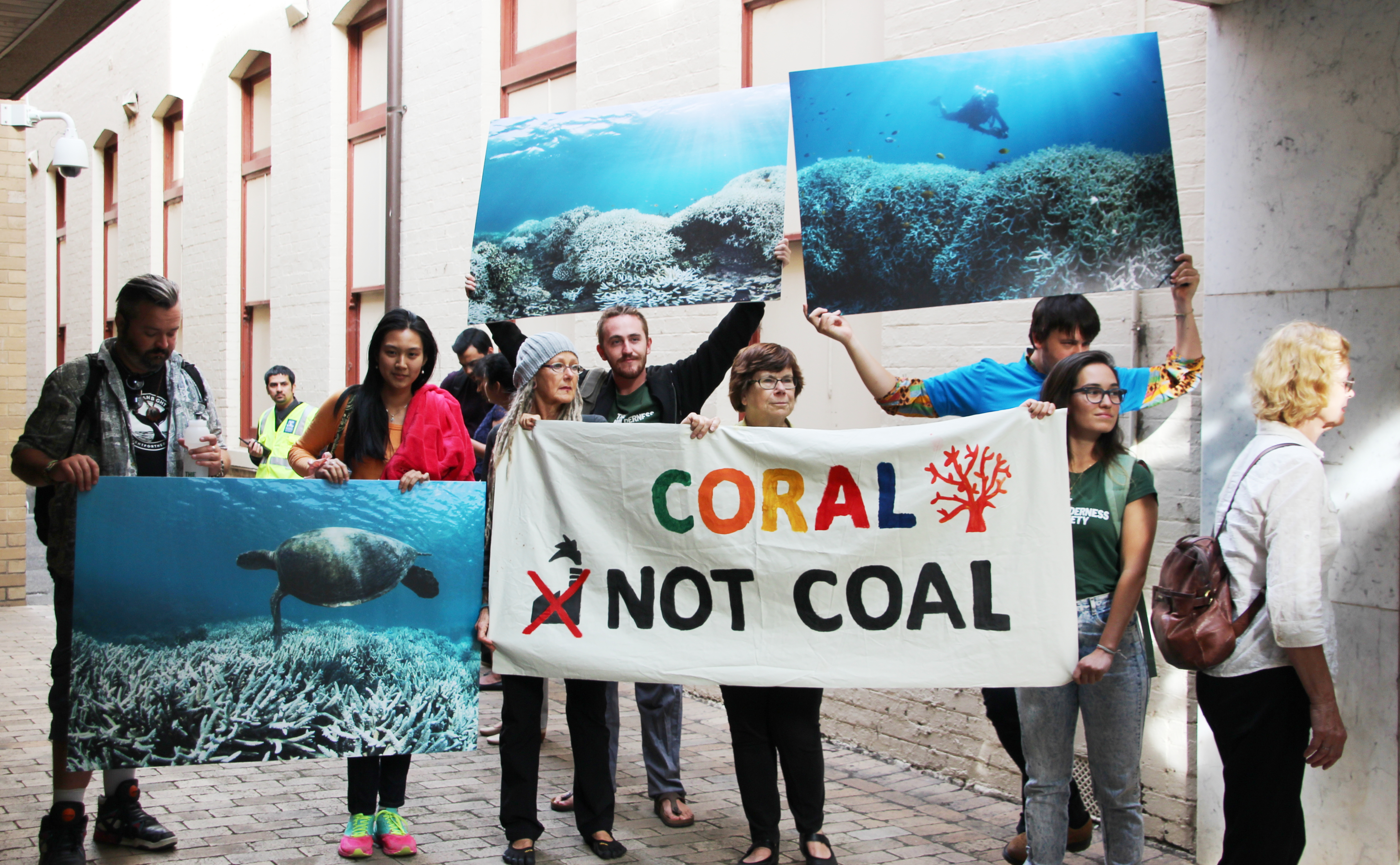
A protest against the Adani Carmichael mine, 2016

A freedom of information request by the Northern Queensland Conservation Council in 2014 showed that Queensland Nickel discharged nitrate-laden water into the Great Barrier Reef in 2009 and 2011—releasing 516 tonnes (508 long tons; 569 short tons) of toxic waste water on the latter occasion. In June 2012, Queensland Nickel stated it intended to release waste water, continuously for three months, "at least 100 times the allowed maximum level as well as heavy metals and other contaminants". A GBRMPA briefing stated the company had "threatened a compensation claim of $6.4bn should the GBRMPA intend to exert authority over the company's operations". In response to the publicisation of the dumping incidents, the GBRMPA stated:

We have strongly encouraged the company to investigate options that do not entail releasing the material to the environment and to develop a management plan to eliminate this potential hazard; however, GBRMPA does not have legislative control over how the Yabulu tailings dam is managed.

=== Dumping ===
Following a tour of the Great Barrier Reef area by WHC members, a 2012 UNESCO report, which criticised management of the Great Barrier Reef, specifically recommended no new port development outside the established areas of Abbot Point, Gladstone, Hay Point/Mackay and Townsville. However, in December 2013, Greg Hunt, the Australian environment minister, approved a plan for dredging to create three shipping terminals as part of the construction of a coalport. According to corresponding approval documents, the process will create around 3 million cubic metres of dredged seabed that will be dumped within the Great Barrier Reef marine park area.

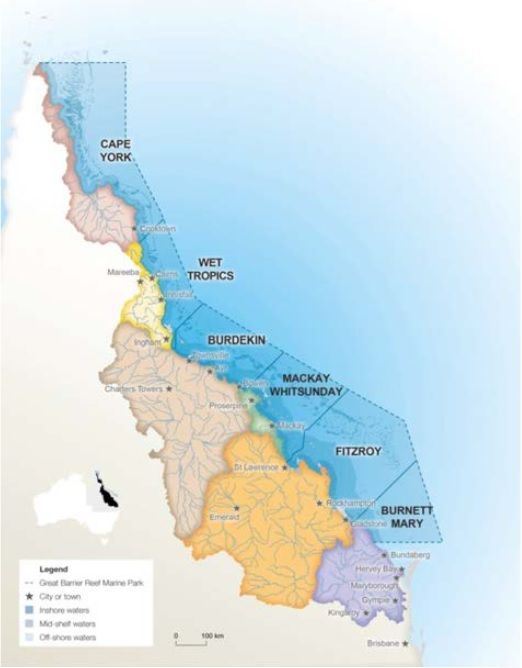
Catchments along the Great Barrier Reef

On 31 January 2014, the GBRMPA issued a dumping permit that will allow three million cubic metres of sea bed from Abbot Point, north of Bowen, to be transported and unloaded in the waters of the Great Barrier Reef Marine Park. Potential significant harms have been identified in relation to dredge spoil and the process of churning up the sea floor in the area and exposing it to air: firstly, new research shows the finer particles of dredge spoil can cloud the water and block sunlight, thereby starving sea grass and coral up to distances of 80 km away from the point of origin due to the actions of wind and currents. Furthermore, dredge spoil can literally smother reef or sea grass to death, while storms can repeatedly resuspend these particles so that the harm caused is ongoing; secondly, disturbed sea floor can release toxic substances into the surrounding environment. In 2019, GBRMPA updated regulations to enforce zoning, permits, operation of vessels, and Outlook reports every 5 years by Reef Authority. Regulation 104 restricts large scale dumping which limits GBRMPA to deny dumping if it exceeds 15,000 cubic meters.

The dredge spoil from the Abbot Point port project is to be dumped 24 kilometres (15 mi) away, near Bowen in north Queensland, and the approval from the Authority will result in the production of an extra 70 million tonnes of coal annually, worth between A$1.4 billion and $2.8 billion. Authority chairman, Dr Russell Reichelt, stated after the confirmation of the approval:

This approval is in line with the agency's view that port development along the Great Barrier Reef coastline should be limited to existing ports. As a deepwater port that has been in operation for nearly 30 years, Abbot Point is better placed than other ports along the Great Barrier Reef coastline to undertake expansion as the capital and maintenance dredging required will be significantly less than what would be required in other areas. It's important to note the seafloor of the approved disposal area consists of sand, silt and clay and does not contain coral reefs or seagrass beds.

The approval was provided with a corresponding set of 47 new environmental conditions that include the following:

- A long-term water quality monitoring plan extending five years after the disposal activity is completed.
- A heritage management plan to protect the Catalina second world war aircraft wreck in Abbot Bay.
- The establishment of an independent dredging and disposal technical advice panel and a management response group, to include community representatives.

Numerous responses, including online petitions, were published in opposition to the proposal: Greenpeace launched the "Save the Reef" campaign in opposition to the dumping, which remained active with over 170,000 signatures on 3 March 2014; in addition to an online petition that registered more than 250,000 signatures on 3 March 2014, political activist group GetUp! are also funding a legal case in conjunction with non-profit Environmental Defenders Office of Queensland (EDO), which represents the North Queensland Conservation Council; and "Fight for the Reef", a partnership between World Wide Fund for Nature (WWF)-Australia and the Australian Marine Conservation Society (AMCS), maintains a campaign that collects online donations to fund a "legal fighting team", and displayed nearly 60,000 supporters on its website on 11 May 2014.

The legal fighting team of the WWF-Australia and the AMCS received further support in April 2014 following the release of the "Sounds for the Reef" musical fundraising project. Produced by Straightup, the digital album features artists such as John Butler, The Herd, Sietta, Missy Higgins, The Cat Empire, Fat Freddys Drop, The Bamboos (featuring Kylie Auldist) and Resin Dogs. Released on 7 April, the album's 21 songs were sold on the Bandcamp website.

Further support for the WWF-Australia and AMCS partnership occurred in late April 2014, when the Ben & Jerry's ice cream company signed onto the "Fight for the Reef" campaign. In early April 2014, the company withdrew the popular "Phish Food" flavour in Australia due to the aquatic association and the potential for awareness-raising. The product withdrawal decision followed tours around select parts of the nation that involved Ben & Jerry's representatives distributing free ice cream to highlight the reef damage issue.

In response, Minister for the Environment and Heritage Protection of Queensland Andrew Powell said that he would be contacting parent corporation Unilever, explaining, "The only people taking a scoop out of the reef is Ben and Jerry's and Unilever. If you understand the facts, you'd want to be boycotting Ben and Jerry's". The Australian public was also informed by Australian Ben & Jerry's brand manager Kalli Swaik, who stated to the Brisbane Times newspaper: "Ben & Jerry's believes that dredging and dumping in world heritage waters surrounding the marine park area will be detrimental to the reef ecology. It threatens the health of one of Australia's most iconic treasures."

A Queensland state senator, Matthew Canavan, confirmed that he raised the issue in writing with the Australian Competition & Consumer Commission (ACCC) and said to The Courier-Mail:

Ben & Jerry's can campaign on whatever issue they like but as a company they have an obligation to tell Australians the whole truth and nothing but the truth. Australia has strict laws to protect consumers against misleading and deceptive behavior. These mistruths could cost jobs and development in regional Queensland. It's irresponsible behavior from a company that should know better.

In 2015 the mining industry generated proposals for 5 additional port developments outside the existing ports. In response the Great Barrier Reef Marine Park Authority proposed a ban on disposal of all capital works dredge spoil in the GBR Marine Park, including the yet to be commenced Abbot Point development. This regulation change to the Great Barrier Reef Marine Park Act 1975 was enacted in 2015.

After Cyclone Debbie in 2017, the Adani-operated port released water with eight times the permitted sediment into the Abbot Point lagoon.

== Climate change ==
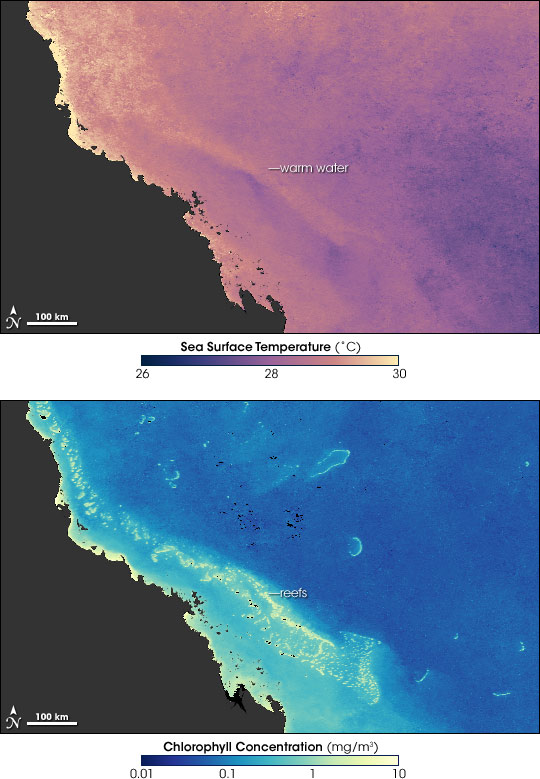
Sea temperature and bleaching of the Great Barrier Reef

According to the GBRMPA in 2014, the most significant threat to the status of the Great Barrier Reef is climate change, due to the consequential rise of sea temperatures, gradual ocean acidification and an increase in the number of "intense weather events". Hughes writes of "the demonstrable failure of the state and Commonwealth" to address the issue of climate change in his August 2014 article. Furthermore, a temperature rise of between two and three degrees Celsius would result in 97% of the Great Barrier Reef being bleached every year.

Reef scientist Terry Done has predicted that a one-degree rise in global temperature would result in 82% of the reef bleached—two degrees would result in 97%, while three degrees would result in "total devastation". A predictive model based on the 1998 and 2002 bleaching events has concurred that a temperature rise of three degrees would result in total coral mortality.

However, a few scientists hold that coral bleaching may in some cases be less of a problem than the mainstream believes. Professor Peter Ridd, from James Cook University in Townsville was quoted in The Australian (a conservative newspaper) as saying; "They are saying bleaching is the end of the world, but when you look into it, that is a highly dubious proposition". Research by scientist Ray Berkelmans "... has documented astonishing levels of recovery on the Keppel outcrops devastated by bleaching in 2006." A related article in The Australian newspaper goes on to explain that; "Those that expel their zooxanthellae have a narrow opening to recolonise with new, temperature-resistant algae before succumbing. In the Keppels in 2006, Berkelmans and his team noticed that the dominant strain of zooxanthellae changed from light and heat-sensitive type C2, to more robust types D and C1."

Nevertheless, most coral reef researchers anticipate severely negative effects from climate change already occurring, and potentially disastrous effects as climate change worsens. The future of the Reef may well depend on how much the planet's climate changes, and thus, on how high atmospheric greenhouse gas concentration levels are allowed to rise. On 2 September 2009, a report by the Australian Great Barrier Reef Marine Park Authority revealed that if carbon dioxide levels reached 450 parts per million corals and reef habitats will be highly vulnerable. If carbon dioxide levels are managed at or below 380 parts per million they will be only moderately vulnerable and the reefs will remain coral-dominated.

Global warming may have triggered the collapse of reef ecosystems throughout the tropics. Increased global temperatures are thought by some to bring more violent tropical storms, but reef systems are naturally resilient and recover from storm battering. Most people agree that an upward trend in temperature will cause much more coral bleaching; others suggest that while reefs may die in certain areas, other areas will become habitable for corals, and new reefs will form. However, the rate at which the mass bleaching events occur is estimated to be much faster than reefs can recover from, or adjust to. As of 2022 there have been 6 mass bleaching events, out of those 3 occurred between 2016 and 2020. The Great Barrier Reef Marine Park Authority reported a mass bleaching event over the 2021-2022 summer had affected 91% of the reefs. It was the fourth mass bleaching event to occur over 7 years and the first to occur during La Niña. In December of 2021 temperatures in 85% of the Great Barrier Reef were higher than any other year. We are beginning to see the long term affects of climate change on the sensitive coral population through widespread bleaching events. La Niña is to blame for the excessively high temperatures during the 2021-2022 summer causing coral stress to be 2.5 higher than previous La Niña years.

However, Kleypas et al. in their 2006 report suggest that the trend towards ocean acidification indicates that as the sea's pH decreases, corals will become less able to secrete calcium carbonate. In 2009, a study showed that Porites corals, the most robust on the Great Barrier Reef, have slowed down their growth by 14.2% since 1990. It suggested that the cause was heat stress and a lower availability of dissolved calcium to the corals.

Climate change has implications for other forms of life on the Great Barrier Reef as well – some fishes' preferred temperature range lead them to seek new areas to live, thus causing chick mortality in seabirds that prey on the fish. Also, in sea turtles, higher temperatures mean that the sex ratio of their populations will change, as the sex of sea turtles is determined by temperature. The habitat of sea turtles will also shrink. A 2018 study which compared the sex ratio of green sea turtles in the northern and southern populations found that the northern population was almost all female.

On 22 April 2018 scientists expressed alarm that the impact of climate change could cause massive damage to the ecosystem. Previous research has estimated a rise of 3 degrees would be detrimental to coral health. Since then temperatures have risen approximately .08 degrees Celsius.

The Great Barrier Reef "glue" is at risk from ocean acidification: a study in 2020 argues that in the present-day context of rapid global climate change, changes in dissolved carbon dioxide, pH and temperature, could lead to reduced microbial crust formation, thereby weakening reef frameworks in the future. The study involved extensive sampling of the Great Barrier Reef fossil record and has shown that the calcified scaffolds that help stabilize and bind its structure become thin and weaker as pH levels fall.

== Crown-of-thorns starfish ==
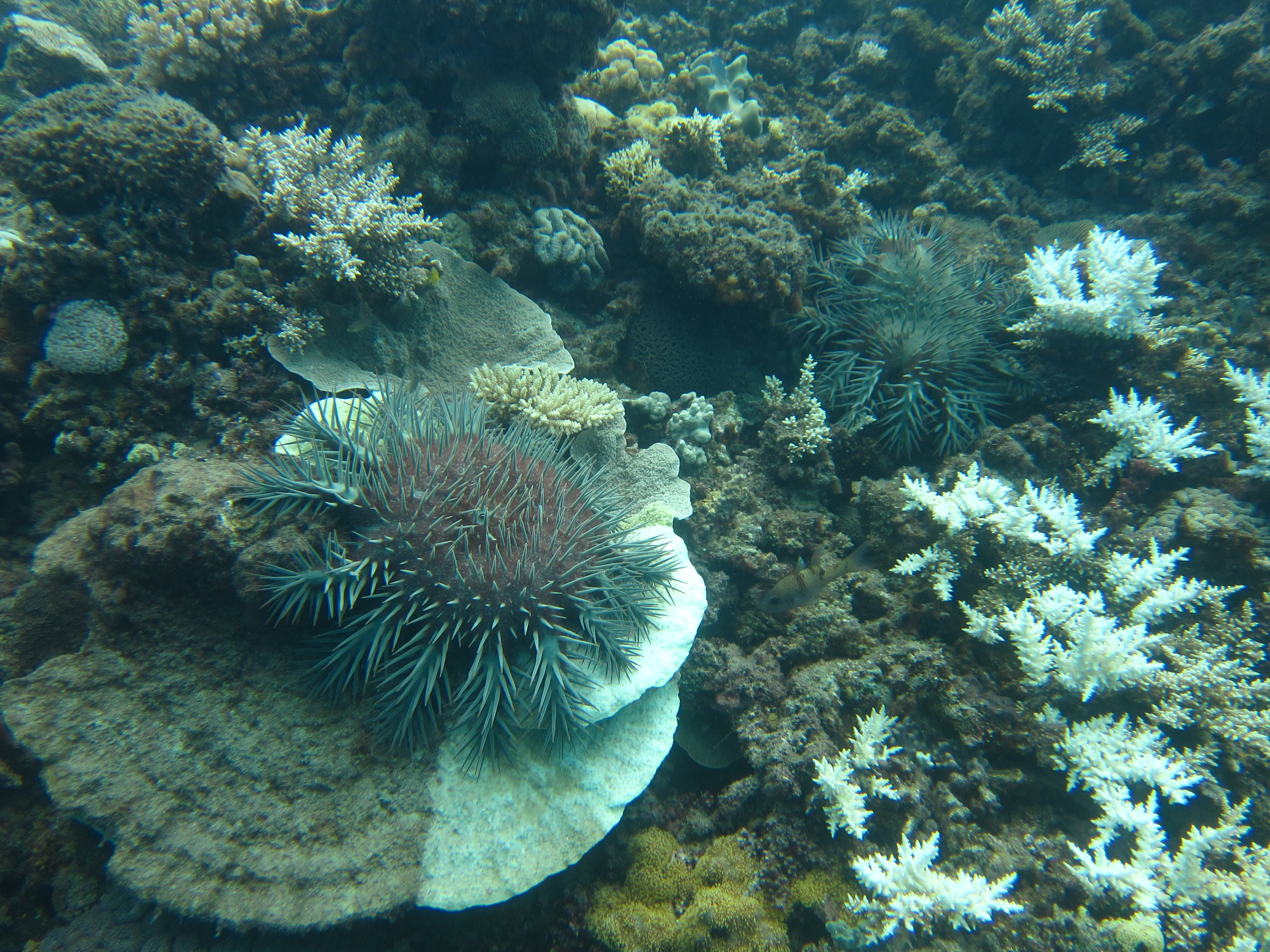
Crown-of-thorns starfish and eaten coral off the coast of Cooktown, Queensland

The crown-of-thorns starfish is a coral reef predator which preys on coral polyps by climbing onto them, extruding its stomach over them, and releasing digestive enzymes to absorb the liquefied tissue. An individual adult of this species can eat up to six square meters of living reef in a single year. Geological evidence suggests that the crown-of-thorns starfish has been part of the Great Barrier Reef's ecology for "at least several thousand years", but there is no geological evidence for crown-of-thorns outbreaks. The first known outbreak occurred during the 1960s. Large outbreaks of these starfish can devastate reefs. In 2000, an outbreak contributed to a loss of 66% of live coral cover on sampled reefs in a study by the CRC Reefs Research Centre. Although large outbreaks of these starfish are believed to occur in natural cycles, human activity in and around the Great Barrier Reef can worsen the effects. Reduction of water quality associated with agriculture can cause the crown-of-thorns starfish larvae to thrive. Fertilizer runoff from farming increases the amount of phytoplankton available for the crown-of-thorns starfish larvae to consume. A study by the Australian Institute of Marine Science showed that a doubling of the chlorophyll in the water leads to a tenfold increase in the crown-of-thorns starfish larvae's survival rate. Overfishing of its natural predators, such as the Giant Triton, is also considered to contribute to an increase in the number of crown-of-thorns starfish. The CRC Reef Research Centre defines an outbreak as when there are more than 30 adult starfish in an area of one hectare. There have been three large outbreaks of COTS on the reef since observation began, between 1962 and 1976; 1978 and 1991; 1993 and 2005, and a fourth began in 2009. Investigation is being undertaken into mimicking a chemical scent released by the COTS' natural predator, the giant triton snail.

== Overfishing ==
The unsustainable overfishing of keystone species, such as the Giant Triton and sharks, can cause disruption to food chains vital to life on the reef. Fishing also impacts the reef through increased pollution from boats, bycatch of unwanted species (such as dolphins and turtles) and reef habitat destruction from trawling, anchors and nets. Overfishing of herbivore populations can cause algal growths on reefs. The batfish Platax pinnatus has been observed to significantly reduce algal growths in studies simulating overfishing. Sharks are fished for their meat, and when they are part of bycatch, it is common to kill the shark and throw it overboard, as there is a belief that they interfere with fishing. As of 1 July 2004, approximately one-third of the Great Barrier Reef Marine Park is protected from species removal of any kind, including fishing, without written permission. However, illegal poaching is not unknown in these no-take zones. A 2015 study into coral trout on the Great Barrier Reef found that the no-take zones had more coral trout and more coral trout larvae after tropical cyclone events, which helped replenish those areas sooner. The GBRMPA has a hotline to report suspected poachers.

== Shark culling ==
The government of Queensland has a "shark control" program (shark culling) that deliberately kills sharks in Queensland, including in the Great Barrier Reef. Environmentalists and scientists say that this program harms the marine ecosystem; they also say it is "outdated, cruel and ineffective". The Queensland "shark control" program uses shark nets and drum lines with baited hooks to kill sharks in the Great Barrier Reef – as of 2018, there are 173 lethal drum lines in the Great Barrier Reef. In Queensland, sharks found alive on the baited hooks are shot. Queensland's "shark control" program killed about 50,000 sharks from 1962 to 2018. In addition, Queensland's "shark control" program has killed many other animals (such as dolphins and turtles) – the program killed 84,000 marine animals from 1962 to 2015, including in the Great Barrier Reef.

In 2018, Humane Society International filed a lawsuit against the government of Queensland to stop shark culling in the Great Barrier Reef. In 2019, a court (tribunal) said the lethal practices had to stop, but the government of Queensland resumed shark-killing in the Great Barrier Reef when they appealed the decision. The litigation is ongoing.

== Shipping ==
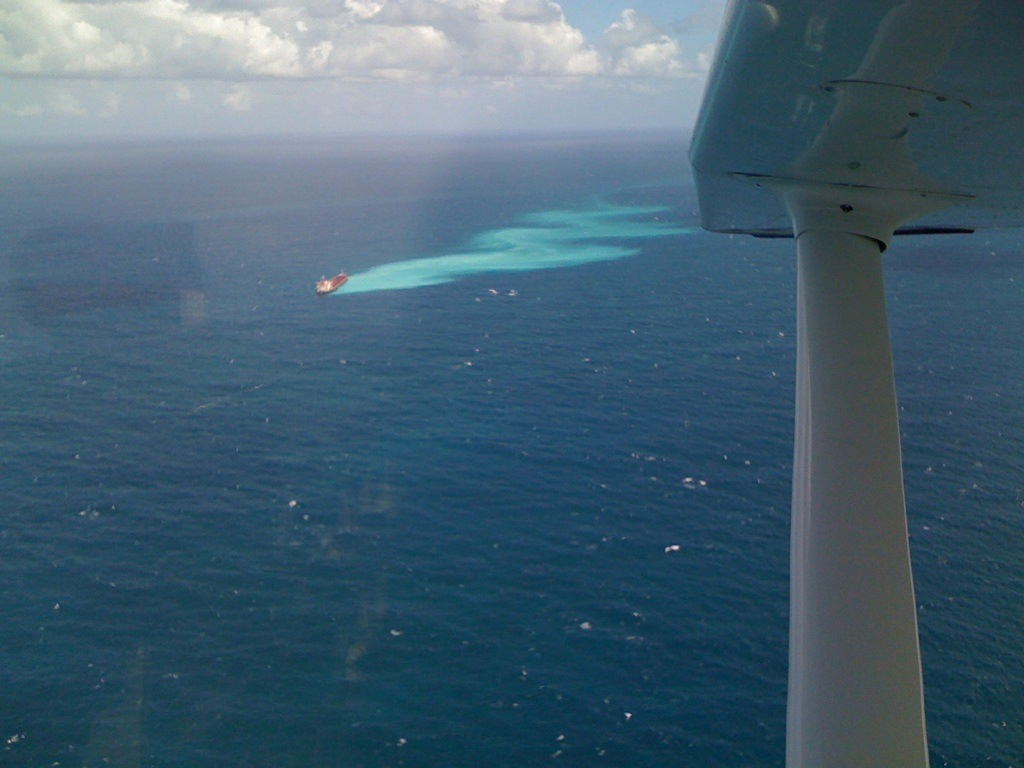
The Shen Neng 1 aground on the Great Barrier Reef, 5 April 2010

Shipping accidents continue to be perceived as a threat, as several commercial shipping routes pass through the Great Barrier Reef. The GBRMPA estimates that about 6000 vessels greater than 50 metres (164 ft) in length use the Great Barrier Reef as a route. From 1985 to 2001, 11 collisions and 20 groundings occurred along the Great Barrier Reef shipping route, with human error identified as the leading cause of shipping accidents.

Reef pilots have stated that they consider the reef route safer than outside the reef in the event of mechanical failure, since a ship can sit safely while being repaired. The inner route is used by 75% of all ships that travel over the Great Barrier Reef. As of 2007, over 1,600 known shipwrecks have occurred in the Great Barrier Reef region.

Waste and foreign species discharged from ships in ballast water (when purging procedures are not followed) are a biological hazard to the Great Barrier Reef. Tributyltin (TBT) compounds found in some antifouling paint on ship hulls leaches into seawater and is toxic to marine organisms and humans; as of 2002, efforts are underway to restrict its use.

In April 2010, the bulk coal carrier Shen Neng 1 ran aground on the Great Barrier Reef, causing the largest grounding scar to date. The spill caused damage to a 400,000sqm section of the Great Barrier Reef and the use of oil dispersant resulted in oil spreading to reef islands 25 km away. In 2012 and 2013, there were 9619 ship voyages through the Great Barrier Reef region, and this is forecast to increase 250% over the next 20 years.

Over 9,600 ship voyages occurred in the GBRMPA between 2012 and 2013.

== Oil ==
It was suspected that the Great Barrier Reef is the cap to an oil trap, after a 1923 paper suggested that it had the right rock formation to support "oilfields of great magnitude". After the Commonwealth Petroleum Search Subsidies Act of 1957, exploration activities increased in Queensland, including a well drilled at Wreck Island in the southern Great Barrier Reef in 1959. In the 1960s, drilling for oil and gas was investigated throughout the Great Barrier Reef, by seismic and magnetic methods in the Torres Strait, along "the eastern seaboard of Cape York to Princess Charlotte Bay" and along the coast from Cooktown to Fraser Island. In the late 1960s, more exploratory wells were drilled near Wreck Island in the Capricorn Channel, and near Darnley Island in the Torres Strait, but "all results were dry".

In 1970, responding to concern about oil spills such as the Torrey Canyon, two Royal Commissions were ordered "into exploratory and production drilling for petroleum in the area of the Great Barrier Reef". After the Royal Commissions, the federal and state governments ceased allowing petroleum drilling on the Great Barrier Reef. A study in 1990 concluded that the reef is too young to contain oil reserves. Oil drilling remains prohibited on the Great Barrier Reef, yet oil spills due to shipping routes are still a threat to the reef system, with a total of 282 oil spills between 1987 and 2002.

== Tropical cyclones ==
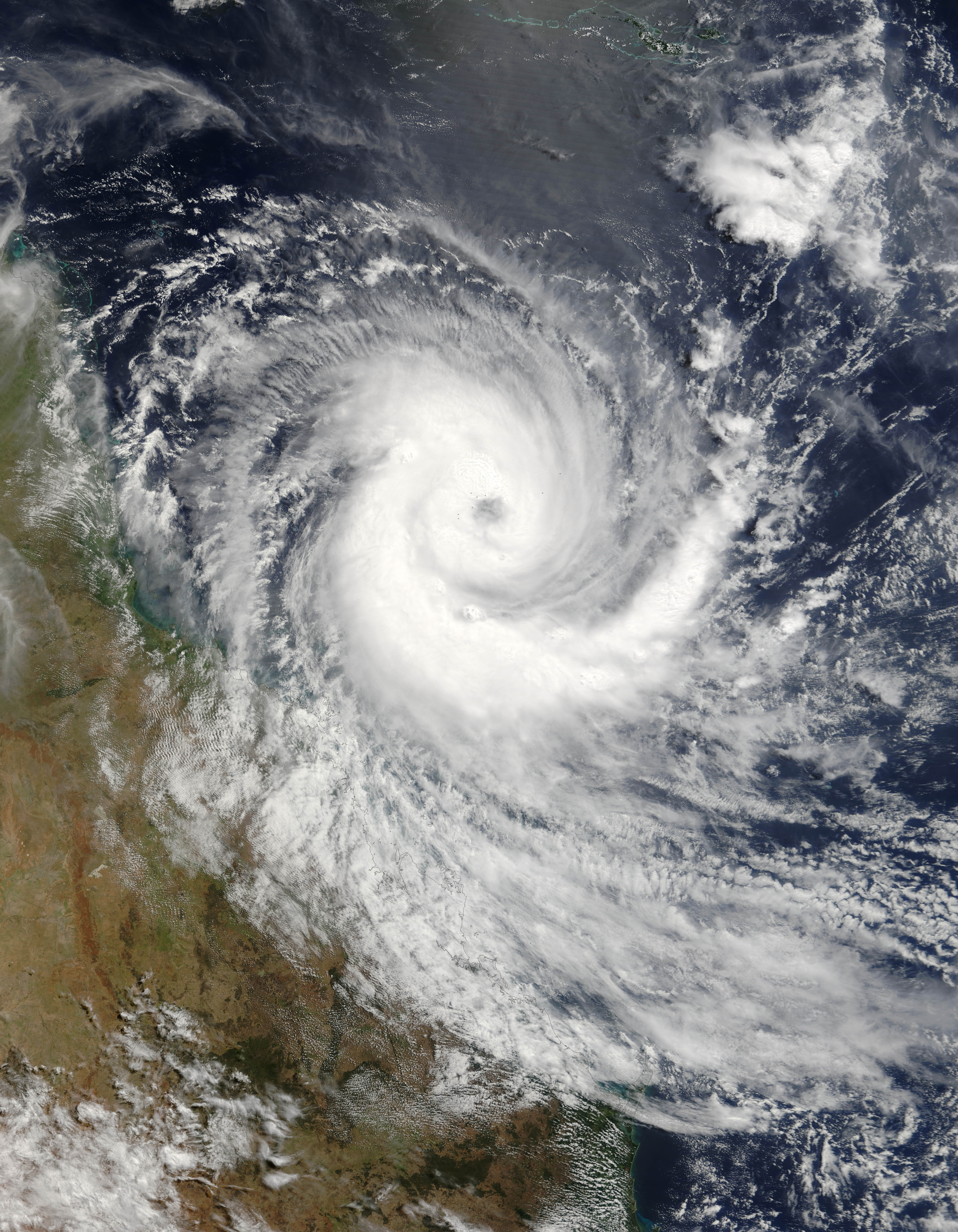
Tropical Cyclone Larry over the Great Barrier Reef, 19 March 2006

Tropical cyclones are a cause of ecological disturbance to the Great Barrier Reef. The types of damage caused by tropical cyclones to the Great Barrier Reef is varied, including fragmentation, sediment plumes, and decreasing salinity following heavy rains (Cyclone Joy). The patterns of reef damage are similarly "patchy". From 1910 to 1999, 170 cyclones' paths came near or through the Great Barrier Reef. Most cyclones pass through the Great Barrier Reef within a day. In general, compact corals such as Porites fare better than branching corals under cyclone conditions. The major damage caused by Tropical Cyclone Larry was to underlying reef structures, and breakage and displacement of corals, which is overall consistent with previous tropical cyclone events. Severe tropical cyclones hit the Queensland coast every 200 to 300 years; however, during the period 1969–1999 most cyclones in the region were very weak – category one or two on the Australian Bureau of Meteorology scale.

On 2 February 2011, Severe Tropical Cyclone Yasi struck northern Queensland and caused severe damage to a stretch of hundreds of kilometres within the Great Barrier Reef. The corals could take a decade to recover fully. Cyclone Yasi had wind speeds of 290 kilometers per hour.

Tropical cyclones also cause the destruction of tourism infrastructure, which causes pollution on the island resorts.

== See also ==
- Environmental issues with coral reefs
- Environmental issues in Australia
- Resilience of coral reefs
