= North West Island =

Island in Queensland, Australia

Coordinates: 23.2965°S 151.7075°E

- North West Island shoreline
- Interactive map of North West Island

Geography
- Location: Coral Sea
- Archipelago: Capricorn Group
- Total islands: 10
- Area: 1.05 km^{2} (0.41 sq mi)

Administration
- Australia
- State: Queensland
- Local Government Area: Gladstone Regional Council

North West Island is a coral cay in the southern Great Barrier Reef, located 75 kilometres northeast of Gladstone, Queensland. North West Island forms part of Capricornia Cays National Park and with an area of 1.05 km^{2}, the island is the second largest coral cay in the Great Barrier Reef. It is part of the Capricornia Cays Important Bird Area.

== History ==
Guano was mined on North West Island during the 1890s. Turtle soup canneries operated on the island from 1904 to 1914 and 1924 to 1926. The environmental importance of North West Island was recognised when it was included as part of Capricornia Cays National Park in 1980.

=== Mystery of the Grave ===
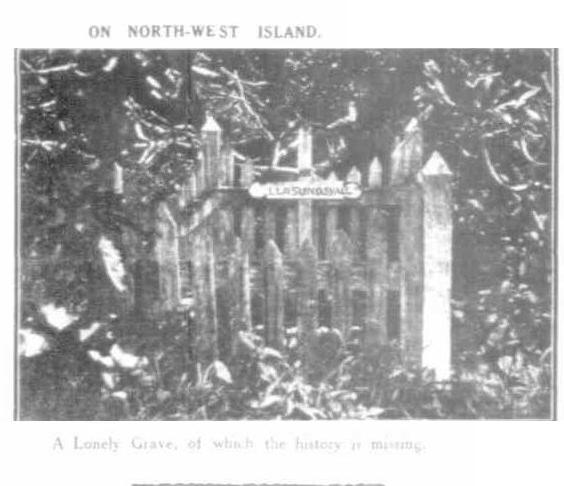
The grave as it was in 1928 where Sundsvall can be read which may refer to the city the person came from

There is a grave located at the Eastern End of the island. There are some differing stories as to the origin of the grave these include In 1902

In our travels through the scrub we came across a baby's grave, beautifully neat and clean even to this day. Loving hands had erected a neat white palisading around the grave, which had for headstone a wooden slab with name and age of the dead baby. The little one sleeps her long sleep under the shade of the evergreen, with the waves bringing a perpetual lullaby

In 1923

Close to this store is a grave where one of these aliens sleeps his (or her) last long sleep. There is a doubt as to the sex for Mr. Owens was uncertain on the point.

In 1926

Today there is but one evidence of that early settlement is a lonely grave, said to be that of a girl of 17 years of age, whose name, to be read on a tiny wooden cross, was L.L. Sundball. The grave is surrounded by a neat fence in excellent preservation. There is some mystery as to the means by which it maintains a permanent neatness.

In 1928

Beneath the gnarled and twisted branches of an aged Tournefortia tree, and surrounded by a neat paling fence, there stands on North-west Island a lonely grave. Carved on the wooden cross at the head is the name L. L. A. Sundvall. and above are the letters H.H. Maybe In this lonely plot, canopied by the dense growth so typical of the Barrier Reef islands, lies hidden a stirring story of heroism, or a gripping epic of a battle against over whelming nature. Maybe the truth will never out, for apart from the bald letters on the cross there is nothing to show the why and wherefore of this solitary resting spot.

Later in 1928

Although it is a few years since he paid a visit there Mr. Barton states that the grave near the old shed is that of an infant, about eighteen months old. He also stated that he had been informed that an adult, who died from the effects of a bite from a sea snake, was buried on the island.

In 1929

There has, been reference in the papers to a grave with a cross with the letters T.J.G. cut in it out on North West Island, the identity of the occupant being unknown. The remains of a man named Tom Galviui, or Galeon, a red-shirt of Garibaldi, are there. The rest, a shark carried away as he was wading out on the reef to a dinghy

In 1966 North West Island became internationally famous when US newspapers published a story called 'Tarzan Terrie' about a 19 year old typist from Brisbane who moved to the remote North West Island alone in the Great Barrier Reef to study marine life. American newspapers of the day ran headlines declaring: "Gay Nature girl gambols Down Under" describing the teenager as a "bikini-clad nature nymph". The stories described her living in a hut near the beach in her "leopard-skin mini-bikini". "To eat she stalks wild fowls, dives for seafood and grows vegetables in the island's rich soils", the report said. Terry's response to the attention was "I came here to think and study fish — it's everything I've ever wanted to do".

In September 2009, Jacob Lollback died while spearfishing off North West Island.

In mid April 2010, it was suspected that the 2010 Great Barrier Reef oil spill had reached North West Island. Small globules of oil were found along a 1 km long section of a beach. Clean-up crews were removing the oil by 14 April. A Maritime Safety Queensland spokesperson doubted the oil could have arrived on the island from the MV Shen Neng 1 so quickly, claiming the oil was from an earlier spill.

Fatal Shark Attack

6 April 2020. A man has died following a shark attack off the Queensland coast.

The 23-year-old man was swimming with a group of friends off North West Island, around 75 kilometres east of Gladstone.

Queensland Police said the man was swimming back to the group's charter boat when he was bitten by the shark. He sustained injuries to his leg, hand and elbow.

A doctor and paramedics responded and treated the man on board the vessel before he was taken to Gladstone Hospital.

Gabrielle Holmes from Capricorn Rescue Service said a helicopter reached the boat at around 6pm.

“At this stage we believe there was a group of them swimming and this patient was the last one to exit the water onto the boat, when the incident occurred,” she told the ABC.

Despite a concerted effort to treat and stabilise the man's condition so he was well enough to travel, he died at approximately 10pm at hospital.

== Flora and fauna ==
The vegetation of the island is dominated by dense Pisonia forest. North West Island is an important nesting ground for seabirds and turtles. As many as 500,000 seabirds habitat the island at any one time. Seventy per cent of the total breeding population of wedge-tailed shearwaters on Australia's east coast nest on the island. The Capricorn silvereye, a small bird endemic to the southern Great Barrier Reef, is found on the island. The green sea turtle and the endangered loggerhead sea turtle nest on the island between November and February. Because of these important rookeries the size of nesting populations is monitored on an annual basis.

Path to the beach

== See also ==
- List of islands of Australia
