= APNG (disambiguation) =

APNG may mean:

- APNG, image file format
- APNG (cable system), submarine telecommunications cable system linking Australia and Papua New Guinea
- APNG-2 (cable system), submarine telecommunications cable system linking Australia and Papua New Guinea
- Airlines PNG, an airline of Papua New Guinea
