= Felicity Wishart =

Australian conservationist and activist

- Born: 4 June 1965; Mitcham, Victoria, Australia
- Died: 19 July 2015 (aged 50); Mullumbimby, New South Wales, Australia
- Education: Griffith University
- Occupation: Conservationist
- Organization(s): Australian Conservation Foundation; The Wilderness Society; Queensland Conservation Council; Australian Marine Conservation Society
- Partner: Todd Harborow

Felicity Jane "Flic" Wishart (4 June 1965 – 19 July 2015) was an Australian conservationist and environmental activist.

== Early life ==
Wishart was born in the Melbourne suburb of Mitcham to parents of Scottish descent from Adelaide, South Australia. At the age of 17, she was arrested in Tasmania during an occupation protest against the Franklin Dam, and imprisoned for several days. In Queensland, she enrolled at Griffith University where she graduated with a Bachelor of Environmental Science.

== Environmental activism ==
After graduation, Wishart joined the Australian Conservation Foundation in Melbourne, where she was involved in the campaign to have Queensland tropical rain forests listed as World Heritage Sites. In 1989, she campaigned for conservation of the Daintree Rainforest for The Wilderness Society.

Wishart returned to Queensland to serve as director of the Queensland Conservation Council between 2000 and 2004, where she led campaigns against land clearing. She returned to The Wilderness Society in 2004, where she was behind the society's climate change and marine conservation campaigns.

Wishart's last campaign was Fight for the Reef on behalf of the Australian Marine Conservation Society, where she fought against environmental threats to the Great Barrier Reef, in particular coal industry development in the Galilee Basin.

Wishart died unexpectedly in her sleep in July 2015, aged 50. In June 2017, the Great Barrier Reef Marine Park Authority announced that Reef No. 18-022 about 50 kilometres (31 mi) north-east of Hinchinbrook Island had been named Felicity Wishart Reef in her honour.
