= Great Oil Spill of 2010 =

Great Oil Spill of 2010 may refer to:

- Deepwater Horizon oil spill
- Great Barrier Reef oil spill
