= Maritime Safety Queensland =

Agency overview
- Formed: 1 October 2002
- Jurisdiction: Queensland
- Headquarters: 41 George Street, Brisbane
- Minister responsible: Bart Mellish, Minister for Transport and Main Roads
- Parent department: Department of Transport and Main Roads
- Website: www.msq.qld.gov.au

Maritime Safety Queensland (MSQ) is a Queensland government agency of the Department of Transport and Main Roads. The agency is responsible for the safety of all water vessels in Queensland waterways. It deals with marine pollution and provides pilotage for Queensland ports. The agency also maintains boating infrastructure including harbours and channels.

Maritime Safety Queensland was established on 1 October 2002 under the Maritime Safety Queensland Act 2002. The agency's main offices are located at Mineral House in George Street, Brisbane. MSQ has a number of pilotage office located across the state. It publishes tide and other charts, cyclone contingency plans and beacon directories.

MSQ investigated the collision of Jessica Watson's boat with Chinese bulk carrier, the Silver Yang, at the start of her round the world trip. The agency found that Ms Watson had not acted responsibly or planned adequately.

== Oil spills ==
Maritime Safety Queensland has had to respond to a number of oil spills. These include the 2010 Great Barrier Reef oil spill and the 2009 southeast Queensland oil spill. In 2006, response teams from MSQ coordinated cleanup efforts after the Global Peace leaked oil from damaged fuel tanks into Gladstone Harbour.

== See also ==
- Australian Maritime Safety Authority
