= Australian Marine Conservation Society =

Australian not-for-profit organisation

Australian Marine Conservation Society (AMCS)
- Founded: 1965; Brisbane, Australia
- Type: Non-governmental organization
- Purpose: Environmentalism
- Location: Brisbane
- Region served: Australia
- Method: Activism
- Website: www.marineconservation.org.au/

The Australian Marine Conservation Society (AMCS) is an Australian environmental not-for-profit organisation. It was founded in 1965 as the Queensland Littoral Society before changing its name to the Australian Littoral Society and then finally in 1995 to its current title. It works on protecting the health and vitality of Australia's coasts and oceans.

The Australian Marine Conservation Society is Australia's only national charity dedicated exclusively to protecting ocean wildlife and their homes.

The Australian Marine Conservation Society is an independent charity.

The Patron of the Australian Marine Conservation Society is author Tim Winton.

== Campaigns ==
The key focus of AMCS is to create large marine national parks (marine sanctuaries), sustainable fisheries and protect and recover threatened ocean wildlife, such as sharks, seals and whales. AMCS also works to protect Australia's coasts from inappropriate development, including along the Great Barrier Reef.

=== Fight For Our Reef ===
AMCS has worked to protect the Great Barrier Reef for many years from threats such as industrialisation, port development, coral mining and dumping. Today, AMCS focuses on saving the Great Barrier Reef from climate change after two mass coral bleaching events affected half of all shallow water corals in 2016 and 2017. The AMPTO and tourism operators in North Queensland work with AMCS to represent the voices of tourism employees and their reliance on a healthy Great Barrier Reef for employment.

AMCS also works to improve the laws and regulations around water quality and water pollution in Queensland. Chemicals, sediment and fertilisers wash away into Great Barrier Reef waters and this has detrimental effects on corals and sea grass beds. In 2019, AMCS worked on tightening water pollution regulations in Queensland and new laws came into effect in December, 2019.

=== Whaling ===
Ending whaling has been a key focus for the AMCS since the 1970s. AMCS worked on a global campaign in the 1980s that led to the world's first global ban on commercial whaling. In 1982 the International Whaling Commission (IWC) put a hold on commercial whaling of all whale species and populations. This moratorium came into effect in 1985 and is a ban that remains in place today.

Representatives from AMCS attend the IWC every two years and work with other NGOs such as International Fund for Animal Welfare and Humane Society International for anti-whaling, pro-conservation outcomes.

Despite a global ban on commercial whaling, Japan found a loophole and continued to hunt whales under the guise of "scientific purposes" in the Southern Ocean. Pressure from AMCS's advocacy work led to Australia taking Japan to court in 2013 over Japan's governments claims that its Antarctic whaling program was for "scientific purposes". The International Court of Justice issued a binding ruling in March 2014 that Japan's Antarctic whaling program broke international law and had to immediately stop. Japan did not hunt whales for a year after this ruling.

== Key achievements ==
=== Prevented mining on the Great Barrier Reef ===
Known then as the Queensland Littoral Society, the AMCS contested and defeated a proposal to mine limestone on Australia’s Great Barrier Reef in the 1960s. The organisation then went on to lead the public campaign to protect the Reef from mining and oil exploration.

== Staff ==
=== Tooni Mahto ===
Tooni Mahto is a marine biologist who worked at the BBC prior to moving to Australia.

=== Imogen Zethoven AO ===
Imogen Zethoven was made an Officer of the Order of Australia for service to conservation and the environment.

=== Felicity "Flic" Wishart ===
Felicity Wishart's last campaign was Fight for the Reef on behalf of the Australian Marine Conservation Society, where she fought against environmental threats to the Great Barrier Reef, in particular coal industry development in the Galilee Basin. In June 2017, the Great Barrier Reef Marine Park Authority announced that Reef No. 18-022 about 50 kilometres (31 mi) north-east of Hinchinbrook Island had been named Felicity Wishart Reef in her honour.
