= APNG (cable system) =

Submarine telecommunications cable system linking Australia and Papua New Guinea

APNG (for "Australia Papua New Guinea") is a submarine telecommunications cable system in the Coral Sea linking Australia and Papua New Guinea.

It has landing points in Cairns, Queensland, Australia and Port Moresby, Papua New Guinea.

It is an analogue coaxial copper cable with a capacity of 480 channels at 5 MHz each, giving a data rate of 16 Mbit/s. It has a total cable length of 897 km. It started operation in 1976 and has been replaced by the APNG-2 cable, in early 2006.

Significance and Legacy:

The APNG cable played a critical role in boosting regional connectivity and economic development between Australia and Papua New Guinea. It enabled more reliable international communications, supporting everything from business operations to government and social development initiatives. According to the Submarine Cable Map by TeleGeography, the APNG-2 cable—APNG’s successor—continues this today, providing internet and voice connections that are essential for Papua New Guinea’s modern growth and integration with global digital networks.
