= Queensland Conservation Council =

Australian non-governmental organisation

The Queensland Conservation Council (QCC) or Queensland Conservation is a non-governmental organisation that represents all the major conservation organisations of Queensland state in Australia. The organisation have been working to protect Queensland's unique natural environment since 1969. The organisation's office is currently located in West End, Brisbane.

== History ==
The organisation started as the South Queensland Conservation Council with 12 member groups, and by 1975 it served 66 organisations and had over 300 members. It worked on many of the key campaigns throughout the past forty years, including protecting the Conondale Range and Fraser Island, campaigning against uranium mining at Ranger and Ben Lomond, protecting Moreton Island, Cape York and Cooloola National Parks and conserving the Daintree area and Great Barrier Reef

== Focus of activities ==
QCC's vision is to protect the environment, wildlife and landscapes, conserve precious natural resources and make Queensland businesses and communities more sustainable. The organisation advocates with government, engages with the community and informs through the media. QCC consult, coordinate with and support numerous member groups who are all committed to improving the environment.

QCC's current campaigns are focused on keeping coal in the ground, saying no to the Carmichael coal mine and supporting renewable energy. The Council provides information about public concerns regarding recreational fishing and tourism raised by the establishment of the Coral Sea Heritage Park.

QCC helped in the long fight against sand mining on Moreton Bay and Stradbroke Islands, and lobbied for the establishment of an Environmental Protection Agency in Queensland. During the past decade QCC has opposed fish farms in Moreton Bay and helped to phase out broad scale land clearing. QCC had previously ventured the Rivers Project and provided representation on consultation panels and submissions on issues of state water reform.

== Newsletter ==
- Newsletter (Queensland Conservation Council) Brisbane, Qld. 1976-1992. ISSN 1325-3832. Later Title: Eco sphere 1992-1997 1325-3514. Current Title: Spinifex 1997 to date
- QCC publishes a newsletter, "econnections", which can be obtained through subscription on their website.

== See also ==
- Australian Conservation Foundation
- Australian Marine Conservation Society
- The Wilderness Society
