= 2010 Great Barrier Reef oil spill =

2010 oil spill

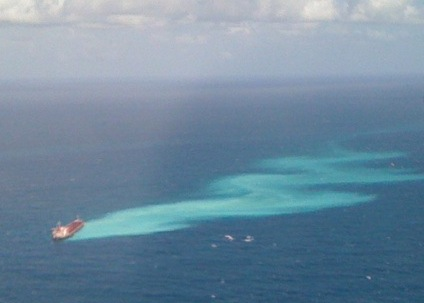
- MV Shen Neng 1 aground, April 2010
- Interactive map of 2010 Great Barrier Reef oil spill
- Location: Great Barrier Reef, Coral Sea, Queensland, Australia
- Coordinates: 23.1017°S 151.6491°E
- Date: 3 April 2010

Cause
- Cause: The grounding of MV Shen Neng 1 on Douglas Shoal off Great Keppel Island
- Operator: Shenzhen Energy

Spill characteristics
- Volume: 20 to 30 m^{3} (710 to 1,060 cu ft)
- Area: 3 km (1.9 mi)

The 2010 Great Barrier Reef oil spill occurred on 3 April 2010, when the Chinese bulk coal carrier, MV Shen Neng 1 ran aground east of Rockhampton in Central Queensland, Australia. The vessel is owned by Shenzhen Energy Transport Co. Ltd.

The ship was more than 10 km outside the shipping lane. It struck the reef late in the afternoon of 3 April, scraping along the reef for a considerable distance and creating the longest known grounding scar on the Great Barrier Reef. Tugs were sent to remove the ship which was feared would break apart in rough seas. Eventually, the vessel was refloated and taken to Hervey Bay. After unloading about a third of its cargo Shen Neng 1 was towed to Singapore. The ship's captain and officer-on-watch were both charged. The maximum fine for shipping companies that cause damage to the reef was increased after the incident.

== Grounding incident ==
The 230-metre (750 ft) bulk carrier was en route to China from Gladstone, Queensland, when it sailed outside the shipping lane and ran aground on Douglas Shoal at around 17:00 on 3 April, 120 kilometres (75 mi) from Rockhampton and 70 km (43 mi) east of Great Keppel Island. One of the vessel's fuel tanks was damaged creating a narrow oil slick of heavy fuel oil 2 nautical miles (3.7 km; 2.3 mi) from Shen Neng 1: though initially estimated at up to 150 tonnes (147.6 long tons), on investigation, it was found that only 3 to 4 t (3.0 to 3.9 long tons) was lost. The slick was broken up using chemical dispersants: the 2-to-3-metre (6.6 to 9.8 ft) swell prevented the use of a boom to contain the oil. Maritime Safety Queensland was considering the possibility that the ship could break up, releasing another 800 t (790 long tons) of fuel oil. Two tugboats were sent out to help secure and stabilise Shen Neng 1, and a Queensland Maritime Police launch was placed on standby to rescue the 23 crew members if necessary. According to the Australian Maritime Safety Authority, Shen Neng 1 was supposed to be on a route between Douglas Shoal and the Capricorn Islands, but went aground 5.8 nmi (10.7 km; 6.7 mi) outside the shipping lane.

== Damage ==
Shen Neng 1 created the largest grounding scar on the Great Barrier Reef known to date. The scar was roughly 3 kilometres (1.9 mi) long and 250 m (820 ft) wide. Some damaged areas have become completely devoid of marine life. There are concerns that there could be considerable long-term damage to the reef and it will be 10 to 20 years before the reef returns to the state it was in before the incident.

By 13 April 2010, oil tarballs were washing up on the beaches of North West Island, a significant bird rookery and turtle nesting colony.

== Response ==
A preliminary MSQ investigation determined that the ship was 15 nautical miles (28 km; 17 mi) off course. MSQ spokesman Adam Nicholson called it "outrageous" that a ship would be that far off course, especially considering that it ended up in the Great Barrier Reef Marine Park, a UNESCO World Heritage Site that is subject to very stringent environmental restrictions. He likened the situation to a car veering off a two-mile-wide road. The location of the grounding means that the fuel may contaminate the Great Barrier Reef, specifically the area around Great Keppel Island and Shoalwater Bay. Conservationists, including the Australian Greens political party and the Capricorn Conservation Council, have questioned the lack of requirement to have pilots stationed aboard ships transiting the Barrier Reef.

Queensland Premier Anna Bligh demanded that Commonwealth authorities "throw the book" at the ship's owner. Bligh said she considered even a minor oil spill "unacceptable", and claimed Shen Neng 1 had broken Australian law by even being in the area. Prime Minister Kevin Rudd visited the site on 5 April, and said that his government's main task at this point was to "bring to account those who are responsible" for threatening what he called Australia's greatest natural asset. He also promised to review shipping rules in the area, amid reports that many vessels frequently took shortcuts, or "rat runs", around the reef. However, only parts of the Great Barrier Reef Marine Park are closed to commercial shipping, and while Douglas Shoal itself is not zoned for use by shipping, the passage between Douglas Shoal and the Capricorn Islands is in a zone that is free for use by shipping. Additionally, data from the Australian Maritime Safety Authority shows that the route between Douglas Shoal and the Capricorn Islands is known by AMSA to be used by the vast majority of vessels travelling between the North and Gladstone via the Coral Sea.

The spill killed over 400 species of animals and over 500 species of plants. Rudd said the company could be fined up to A$5.5 million, while Bligh said the owner could be fined up to A$1 million. The master of the vessel is facing a fine of up to A$55,000 while the chief officer-on-watch is facing a fine of up to A$220,000 Anna Bligh raised the maximum penalty to A$10 million for shipping companies that cause damage to the reef by groundings.

On 14 April 2010, Australian Federal Police officers executed a search warrant on the vessel and arrested the ship's master and chief officer-on-watch. They faced the Gladstone Magistrates Court on 15 April 2010. The ship's master was charged with liability for a vessel which caused damage to the Great Barrier Reef Marine Park and granted bail and allowed to leave Australia. The chief officer-on-watch was charged with the offence of being the person in charge of a vessel that caused damage to the park. He was granted bail on the condition that he reside on the carrier until a more permanent bail arrangement is reached.

The vessel was refloated on 12 April by SVITZER Salvage with the assistance of AMSA Emergency Towage Vessels and anchored in waters near Great Keppel Island under instruction of Glastone Harbour Master. It was first thought that the ship would be taken to Gladstone to unload its cargo of 65,000 tonnes of coal. However Sheng Neng 1 was taken to the calmer waters of Hervey Bay because it was determined that the damage to the ship posed a risk of it breaking apart while passing through the Port of Gladstone.

There was concern amongst conservationists that a leaky ship was brought into a whale sanctuary and Great Sandy Marine Park. The Department of Environment and Resource Management carried out seabed surveys before and after the ship was anchored in the waters off Hervey Bay for 10 days. It found there was no evidence of environmental harm. Clipper Mistral was berthed alongside the bulk carrier and using its own crane began removing 19,000 tonnes of coal on 12 May 2010.

Over 1,200,000 litres of bunker fuel was removed from Sheng Neng 1 via barge and transported to the Port of Gladstone. The fuel contaminated with sea water was then transported to Transpacific holding tanks and later disposed. National Emergency Response Operations Manager Brett Williams said "this was a large volume of fuel that needed to be transported and disposed of". Transpacific trucks rolled around the clock to enable the fuel to reach its destination without delays.

Beach clean-up and removal of oil from the North West Island commenced on 15 April 2010. The ship was connected to a tug for its journey to Singapore on 31 May 2010.

In 2016, the Australian government settled with the ship's owners for $29 Million

== Investigation ==
The Australian Transport Safety Bureau released a preliminary report into the grounding of the ship on 15 April 2010. The report has found that the chief officer, who was officer-of-the-watch had neglected to program a proposed course change into the ship's GPS navigation system due to fatigue. The report stated, that the chief officer failed to plot the ship's position on the Nautical chart in appropriate intervals and for that reason was not aware of the proximity of the shoal. The Great Barrier Reef Vessel Traffic Service was not able to warn him due to limited coverage of the area by their systems.

== Recommendation ==
In response to the Shen Neng grounding, the vessel tracking system known as REEFVTS was extended to the entire length of the Great Barrier Reef. Previously, the tracking system had run from the Torres Strait to just south of Mackay and did not cover the southern part of the reef.

== Remediation ==
Remediation efforts began in 2019 after a lengthy court process.

== See also ==
- 2009 southeast Queensland oil spill
- Environmental threats to the Great Barrier Reef
- Oil spill
