= Coral Sea =

Marginal sea of the South Pacific off the northeast coast of Australia

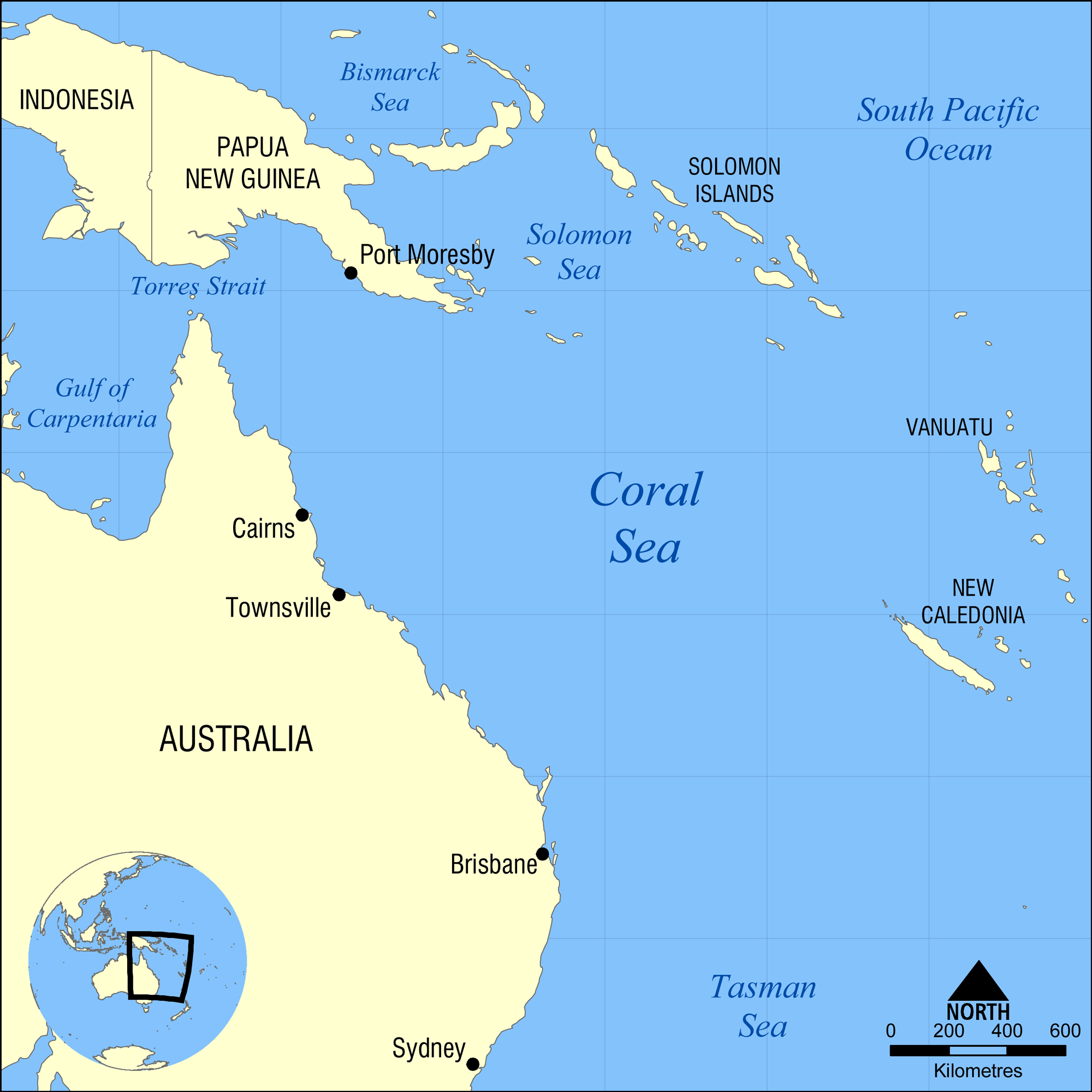
- Interactive map of Coral Sea
- Location: Western Pacific Ocean (Oceania)
- Coordinates: 18°S 158°E
- Type: Sea
- Basin countries: Australia; New Caledonia (France); Papua New Guinea; Solomon Islands; Vanuatu
- Surface area: 4,791,000 km^{2} (1,850,000 sq mi)
- Average depth: 2,394 m (7,854 ft)
- Max. depth: 9,140 m (29,990 ft)
- Water volume: 11,470,000 km^{3} (9.30×10^{12} acre⋅ft)
- Settlements: Australia; Australian settlements: Brisbane; Gold Coast; Sunshine Coast; Townsville; Cairns; Mackay; Gladstone; Mackay; Bundaberg; Tweed Heads; Gladstone; New Caledonia (France); Nouméa; Papua New Guinea; Port Moresby; Vanuatu; Port Vila

The Coral Sea is a marginal sea of the South Pacific off the northeast coast of Australia, and classified as an interim Australian bioregion. The Coral Sea extends 2,000 kilometres (1,200 mi) down the Australian north-east coast to latitude 30° south. Most of it is protected between the French Natural Park of the Coral Sea (French: Parc naturel de la mer de Corail) and the Australian Coral Sea Marine Park. The sea was the location for the Battle of the Coral Sea, a major confrontation during World War II between the navies of the Empire of Japan, and the United States and Australia.

The sea contains numerous islands and reefs (hence the name), as well as the world's largest reef system, the Great Barrier Reef (GBR), which was declared a World Heritage Site by UNESCO in 1981. All previous oil exploration projects were terminated at the GBR in 1975, and fishing is restricted in many areas. The reefs and islands of the Coral Sea are particularly rich in birds and aquatic life and are a popular tourist destination, both domestically and internationally.

== Geography ==
It is bounded in the west by the east coast of Queensland, thereby including the Great Barrier Reef, in the east by Vanuatu (formerly the New Hebrides) and by New Caledonia, and in the northeast approximately by the southern extremity of the Solomon Islands. In the northwest, it reaches to the south coast of eastern New Guinea, thereby including the Gulf of Papua. It merges with the Tasman Sea in the south, with the Solomon Sea in the north and with the Pacific Ocean in the east. On the west, it is bounded by the mainland coast of Queensland, and in the northwest, it connects with the Arafura Sea through the Torres Strait.

The sea is characterised by its warm climate, with frequent rains and tropical cyclones.

== Extent ==
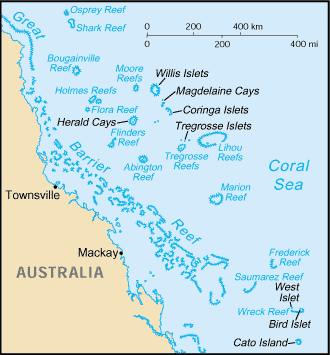
A map of the Coral Sea Islands

While the Great Barrier Reef with its islands and cays belong to Queensland, most reefs and islets east of it are part of the Coral Sea Islands Territory. In addition, some islands west of and belonging to New Caledonia are also part of the Coral Sea Islands in a geographical sense, such as the Chesterfield Islands and Bellona Reefs.

The International Hydrographic Organization defines the limits of the Coral Sea as follows:

On the North. The South coast of New Guinea from the entrance to the Bensbach River (141°01'E) to Gadogadoa Island near its Southeastern extreme (10°38′S 150°34′E), down this meridian to the 100 fathom line and thence along the Southern edges of Uluma Reef and those extending to the Eastward as far as the Southeast point of Lawik Reef (11°43.5′S 153°56.5′E) off Tagula Island, thence a line to the Southern extreme of Rennell Island (Solomon Islands) and from its Eastern point to Cape Surville, the Eastern extreme of San Cristobal Island [Makira], Solomons; thence through Nupani Island, the Northwestern of the Santa Cruz Islands (10°04.5′S 165°40.5′E) to the Northernmost Island of the Duff Islands (9°48.5′S 167°06′E).

On the Northeast. From the Northernmost island of the Duff Islands, through these islands to their Southeastern extreme, thence a line to Méré Lava, Vanuatu Islands(14°25′S 163°03′E) and down the Eastern coasts of the islands of this Group to Anatom Island (20°11′S 169°51′E) in such a way that all the islands of these Groups, and the straits separating them, are included in the Coral Sea.

On the Southeast. A line from the Southeastern extreme of Anatom Island to Nokanhoui (reefs) (22°46′S 167°34′E) off the Southeast extreme of New Caledonia, thence through the East point of Middleton Reef to the Eastern extreme of Elizabeth Reef (29°55′S 159°02′E) and down this meridian to Latitude 30° South.

On the South. The parallel of 30° South to the Australian coast. (Bordering the Tasman Sea.)

On the West. The Eastern limit of the Arafura Sea [The entrance to the Bensbach River (141°01'E), and thence a line to the Northwest extreme of York Peninsula, Australia (11°05′S 142°03′E)] and the East Coast of Australia as far south as Latitude 30° South.

== Geology ==
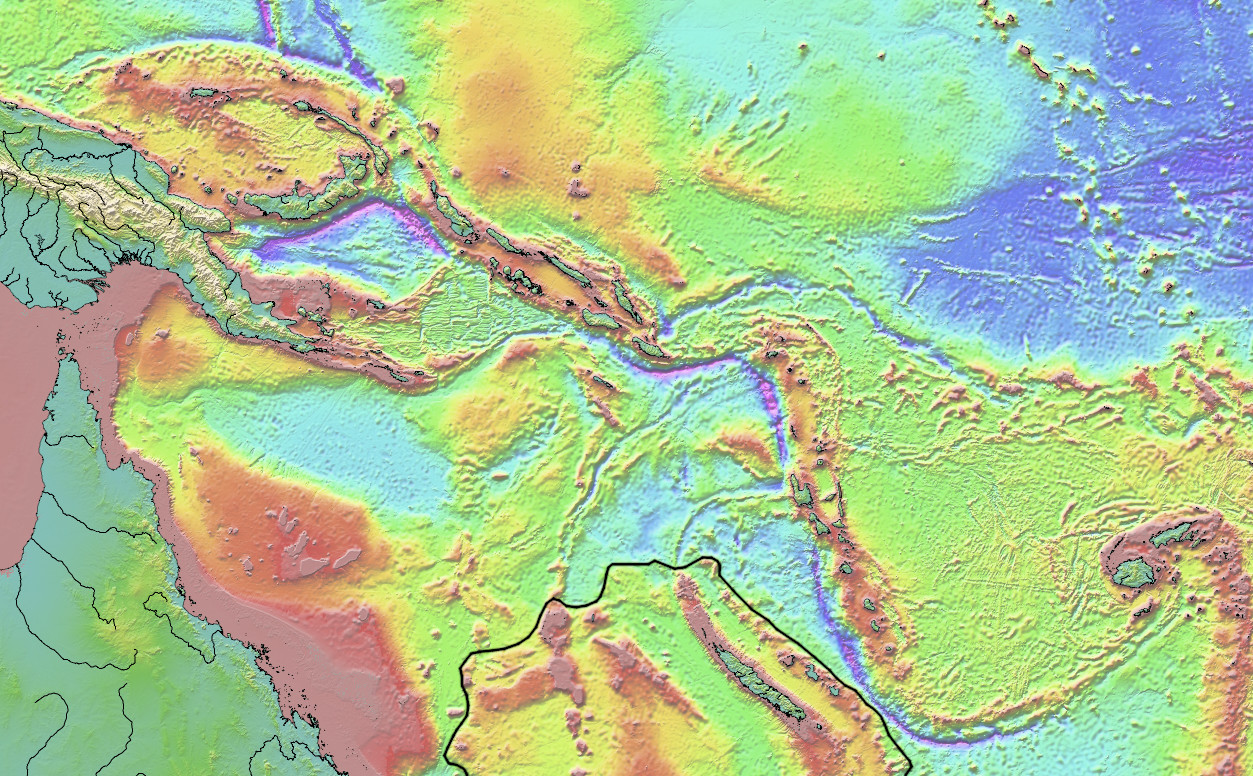
Coral Sea and surrounds topography with Zealandia outlined

The fairly deep Coral Sea basin was formed between 58 million and 48 million years ago when the Queensland continental shelf was uplifted, forming the Great Dividing Range, and continental blocks subsided at the same time. The sea has been an important source of coral for the Great Barrier Reef, both during its formation and after sea level lowering.

The geological formation processes are still proceeding, as partly evidenced by the seismic activity. Several hundred earthquakes with the magnitude between 2 and 6 were recorded in the period 1866–2000 along the Queensland coast and in the Coral Sea. However this seismic activity is much less than to the east or north of the sea, and most of the area under the sea can be regarded as now tectonically inactive except for sedimentation. On 2 April 2007, the Solomon Islands were struck by a major earthquake followed by a several metres tall tsunami. The hypocenter of this magnitude M_{w} 8.1 earthquake was 349 km (217 mi) northwest of Honiara, at a depth of 10 kilometres (6.2 mi). It was followed by more than 44 aftershocks of a magnitude 5.0 or greater. The resulting tsunami killed at least 52 people and destroyed more than 900 homes.

The sea received its name because of its numerous coral formations. They include the Great Barrier Reef, which extends about 2,000 km (1,200 mi) along the northeast coast of Australia and includes approximately 2,900 individual reefs and 1000 islands. The Chesterfield Islands and Lihou Reef are the largest atolls of the Coral Sea.

=== Topography ===
To the east of the north Australian coast is the Great Barrier Reef on the continental shelf. To its east is a plateau that is host to the Coral Sea Islands Territory that is known as either the Coral Sea Plateau or the Queensland Plateau. To the north of the Great Barrier Reef the Eastern and Papuan Plateaus continue the southern continental shelf of New Guinea. The Coral Sea Basin, while being the main oceanic basin of the sea, is associated with much more geologically complex and younger basins situated to the seas's east and south. It is separated to the east from these younger basins by the Louisiade Plateau. To the east of the Louisiade Plateau is what has been named geologically as the Rennell Basin, south-west of Rennell Island, but is gazetted as being known as either the Rennell or Rennel Trough. To the east of this Rennell Basin is the Rennell Island Ridge (Rennel Island Ridge) which contains both Rennell Island and the Indispensable Reefs. To the southeast of the Rennell Island Ridge is the South Rennell Trough, quite a deep spreading center linear structure extending from northeast to southwest extending along the south east border of the Mellish Rise. The main eastern basins are the north the Santa Cruz Basin and to its south the D'Entrecasteaux Basin which is delimited to its south by the undersea D'Entrecasteaux Ridge. South of the D'Entrecasteaux Ridge is the North Loyalty Basin (gazetted as the Loyalty Basin as an alternative name), which is bordered on its southwest by the Loyalty Ridge that contains the Loyalty Islands. This ridge is the north east border of the submerged continent of Zealandia and all the structures on the sea floor of the Coral Sea to its south east are related to this area of continental crust. In turn going to the south west they are the South Loyalty Basin, the New Caledonia Nappe, the New Caledonia Trough (previously known as the New Caledonia Basin) and to its south west the Bellona Plateau.

== Hydrology ==
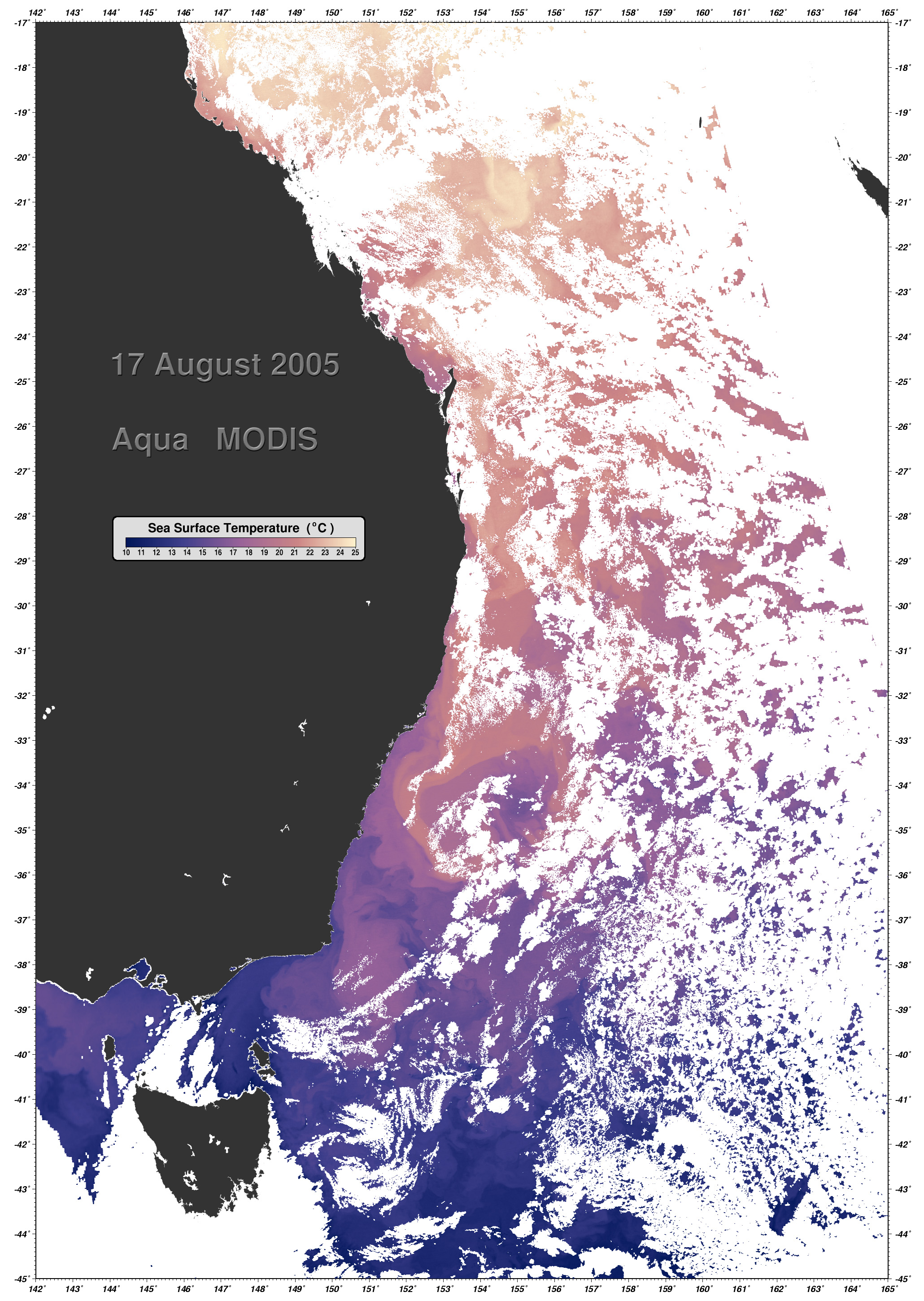
Thermal profile of the East Australian Current

Major Coral Sea currents form a counter-clockwise gyro which includes the East Australian Current. It brings warm nutrient-poor waters from the Coral Sea down the east coast of Australia to the cool waters of the Tasman Sea. This current is the strongest along the Australian coasts and transforms 30 million m^{3}/s of water within a flow band of about 100 kilometres wide and 500 metres deep. The current is strongest around February and weakest around August.

The major river flowing into the sea is the Burdekin River, which has its delta southeast of Townsville. Owing to the seasonal and annual variations in occurrence of cyclones and in precipitation (typically between 200 and 1600 mm/year), its annual discharge can vary more than 10 times between the two succeeding years. In particular, in the period 1920–1999, the average flow rate near the delta was below 1000 m^{3}/s in 1923, 1931, 1939, 1969, 1982, 1985, 1987, 1993 and 1995; it was above 25,000 m^{3}/s in 1927, 1940, 1946, 1950, 1951, 1959, 1968, 1972, 1974 and 1991, and reached about 40,000 m^{3}/s in 1946. This irregularity results in concomitant fluctuations of the sea water composition near the river delta.

The surface water temperature varies on the south of the sea from 19 °C in August to 24 °C in February. It is rather warm and stable at 27–28 °С in the north all through the year. Water salinity is 34.5–35.5‰ (parts per thousand). The water is mostly very clear, with the visibility of about 30 metres (100 ft) near the reefs.

== History ==
The Coral Sea takes its name from its coral formations of the Great Barrier Reef, the largest known reef system in the world. In May 4-8 1942, the Battle of the Coral Sea between Allied and Imperial Japanese naval units took place in the Coral Sea, that prevented the Japanese sea-borne invasion of Port Moresby.

== Climate ==
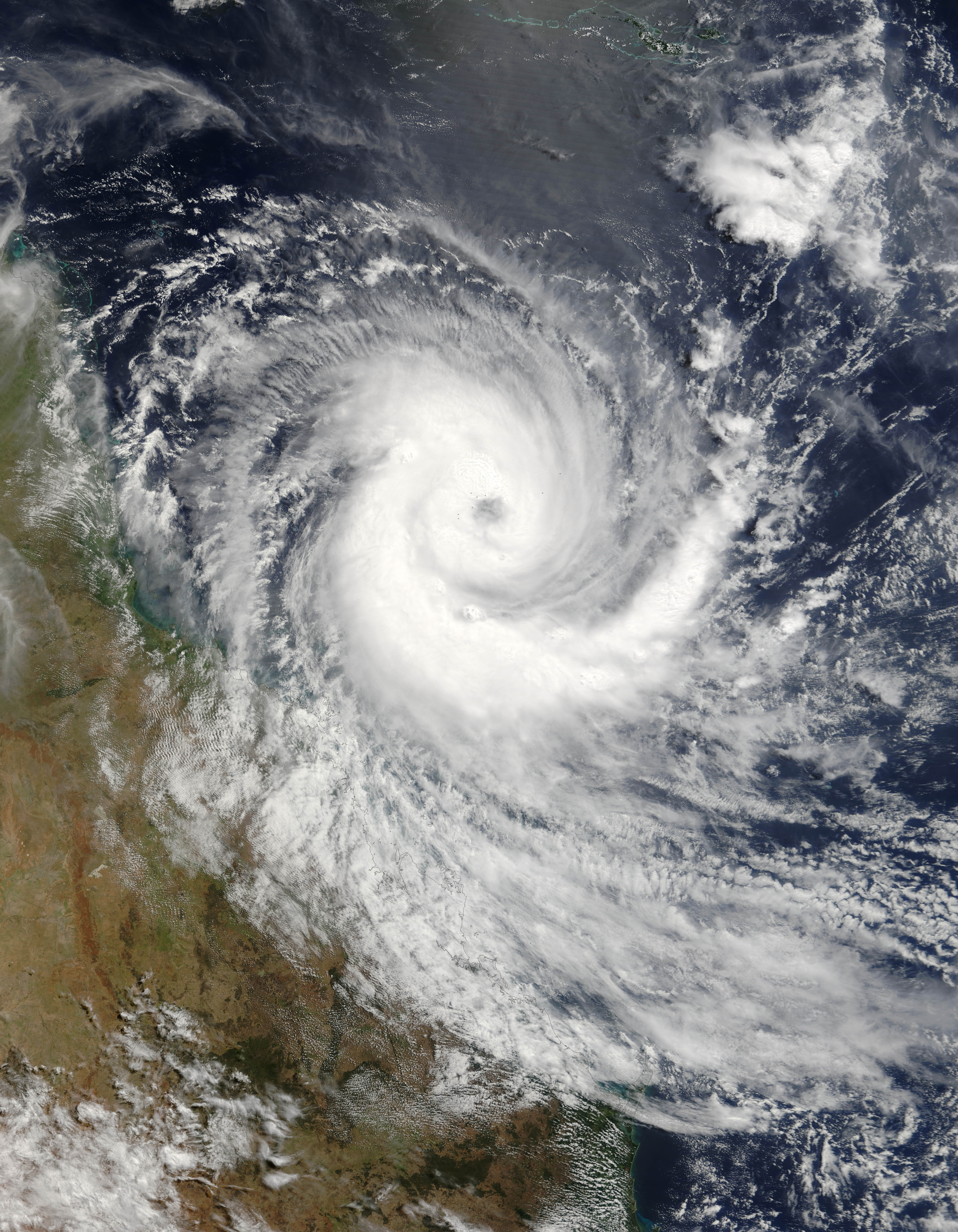
Tropical Cyclone Larry over the Great Barrier Reef, 19 March 2006

The sea has a subtropical climate and is frequently hit by tropical cyclones, especially between January and April. This range extends to November–May in the areas south to 10°S. Between 1969 and 1997, the GBR experienced 80 cyclones, 90% which were of category 1 or 2 (winds 17–33 m/s, central pressure 970–1000 hPa) and only 10% of category 3 (winds >33 m/s, pressure <970 hPa). The cyclone frequency decreased between 1997 and 2005 to 1.5 per year (12 in total).

Annual rainfall typically ranges between 1,000 and 3,000 mm depending on the area. Most rains fall between December and March, in bursts of 30–60 days. The number of clear days per year varies approximately between 80 and 125, and the typical temperature variation through the year are 18–27 °C.

Climate change made it 175 times more likely that the surface waters of the Coral Sea would reach the record-breaking temperatures March 2016 that bleached reefs, modelling analysis showed.

=== Winds ===
Winds in the Coral Sea can be classified by season, longitude and latitude. Southeasterly trade winds dominate through all sea areas and all seasons, especially between 20°S and 25°S, west of the meridian of 155°E. However, between September and December they change to northerly and northwesterly winds in this region, and the direction is mostly southwestern in May–August. West of 155°E, gales are common between January and August and are less frequent in September–December.

In January, the northwest monsoon may occur between the parallels of 15°S and 20°S, west of the 150°E meridian. Gales are rare in this region most of the year except for June–August, when strong southeasterly winds occur a few days per month.

The southeasterly trades are also strong north of 15°S between March and November. They weaken and often change to westerly winds in December and to northerly and northwesterly winds in January and February.

== Flora ==
The Australian shore of the Coral Sea is mostly composed of sand. The GBR is too far away to provide significant coral deposits, but it effectively screens the coast from the ocean waves. As a result, most land vegetation spreads down to the sea, and the coastal waters are rich in underwater vegetation, such as green algae. The most common genera of seagrasses are Halophila and Halodule.

The islands of the GBR contain more than 2,000 plant species, and three of these are endemic. The northern islands have 300–350 plant species which tend to be woody, whereas the southern islands have 200 which are more herbaceous; the Whitsunday region is the most diverse, supporting 1,141 species. The plants are spread by birds.

== Fauna ==
The sea hosts numerous species of anemones, sponges, worms (e.g. Spirobranchus giganteus shown in the photograph), gastropods, lobsters, crayfish, prawns and crabs. Red algae Lithothamnion and Porolithon colour many coral reefs purple-red and the green alga Halimeda is found throughout the sea. The coastal plants consisting of only about 30–40 species, and mangroves occur in the northern part of the sea. Four hundred coral species, both hard corals and soft corals inhabit the reefs. The majority of these spawn gametes, breeding in mass spawning events that are triggered by the rising sea temperatures of spring and summer, the lunar cycle, and the diurnal cycle. Reefs in the inner GBR spawn during the week after the full moon in October, while the outer reefs spawn in November and December. Its common soft corals belong to 36 genera. There are more than 1500 fish species in the reef systems. Five hundred species of marine algae or seaweed live on the reef, including thirteen species of the genus Halimeda, which deposit calcareous mounds up to 100 metres (110 yd) wide, creating mini-ecosystems on their surface which have been compared to rainforest cover.

Crown-of-thorns starfish (Acanthaster planci) is the major predator of the reefs, as it preys upon coral polyps by climbing onto them, extruding its stomach over them, and releasing digestive enzymes to absorb the liquefied tissue. An individual adult can eat up to 6 m^{2} of reef per year. In 2000, an outbreak of crown-of-thorns starfish contributed to a loss of 66% of live coral cover on sampled reefs. Changes in water quality and overfishing of natural predators, such as the giant Triton, may have contributed to an increase in the number of crown-of-thorns starfish.

There are at least 30 species of whales, dolphins, and porpoises, including the dwarf minke whale, Indo-Pacific humpback dolphin, humpback whale and dugongs. Six species of sea turtles breed on the GBR – the green sea turtle, leatherback sea turtle, hawksbill turtle, loggerhead sea turtle, flatback turtle and the olive ridley.

More than 200 species of birds (including 22 species of seabirds and 32 species of shorebirds) visit, nest or roost on the islands and reefs, including the white-bellied sea eagle and roseate tern. Most nesting sites are on islands in the northern and southern regions of the GBR, with 1.4–1.7 million birds using the sites to breed.

Seventeen species of sea snake, including Laticauda colubrina (pictured), live on the GBR in warm waters up to 50 metres (160 ft) deep and are more common in the southern than in the northern section; none of them are endemic or endangered. The venom of many of these snakes is highly toxic; for example, Aipysurus duboisii is regarded as the world's most venomous sea snake.

There are more than 1,500 fish species, including the clownfish (Amphiprioninae), red bass (Lutjanus bohar), red-throat emperor (Lethrinus miniatus), coral trout (Plectropomus leopardus) and several species of snapper (Lutjanidae). Forty-nine species mass spawn and eighty-four other species spawn elsewhere in their range. With a maximum total length of 0.84 cm (0.33 in), Schindleria brevipinguis, which is native to the GBR and Osprey Reef, is one of the smallest known fish and vertebrate. There are at least 330 species of ascidians on the reef system with the diameter of 1–10 cm (0.4–4 in). Between 300 and 500 species of bryozoans live on the reef.

Saltwater crocodiles live in mangrove and salt marshes on the coast. Around 125 species of shark, stingray, skates or chimaera live on the GBR, in addition to about 5,000 species of mollusc. The latter include the giant clam and various nudibranchs and cone snails.

One study of 443 individual sharks gives the following distribution of their species on the Australian side of the Coral Sea: grey reef shark (Carcharhinus amblyrhynchos, 69%), whitetip reef shark (Triaenodon obesus, 21%), silvertip shark (Carcharhinus albimarginatus, 10%), tiger shark (Galeocerdo cuvier, <1%) and great hammerhead (Sphyrna mokarran, <1%). The interaction rate (free diving) at the Coral Sea reefs ranged from a few to 26 sharks per hour. The rare Etmopterus dislineatus shark species is endemic to the central part of the Coral Sea. It has been observed at depths of 590–700 m on or near the continental slope.

Corals on Flynn Reef near Cairns

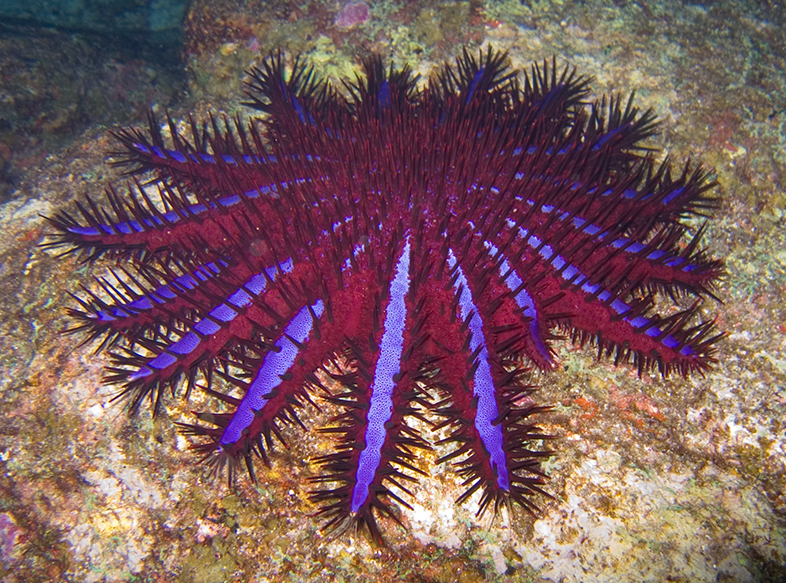
Crown-of-thorns starfish

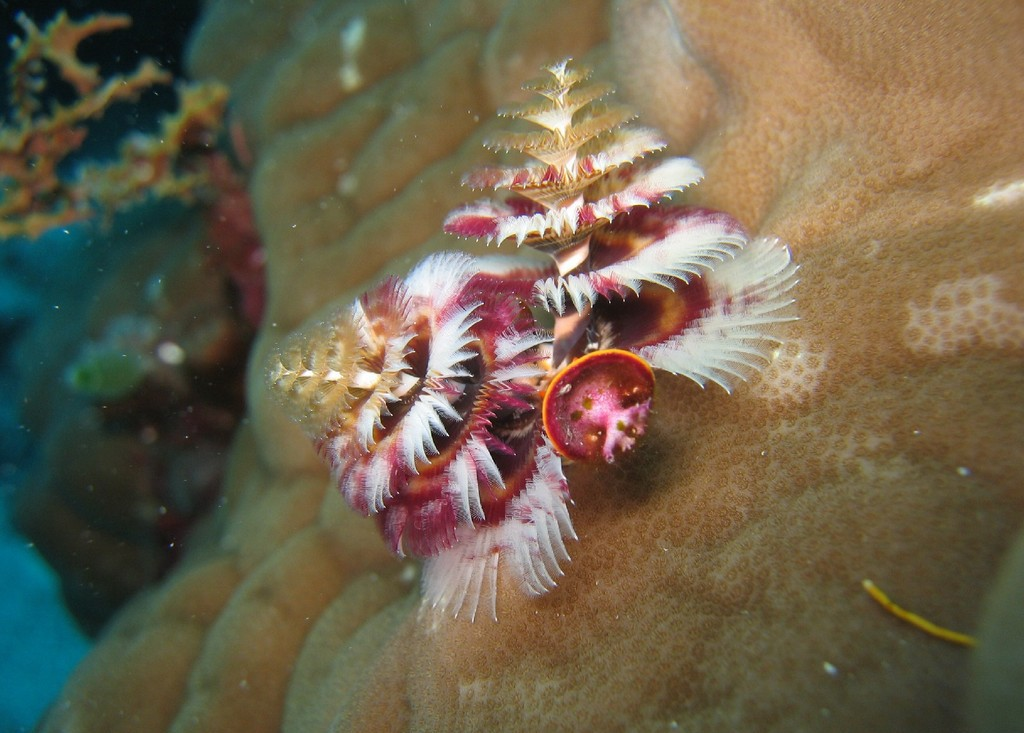
Christmas tree worm (Spirobranchus giganteus) in Porites coral. Admiralty, Osprey Reef

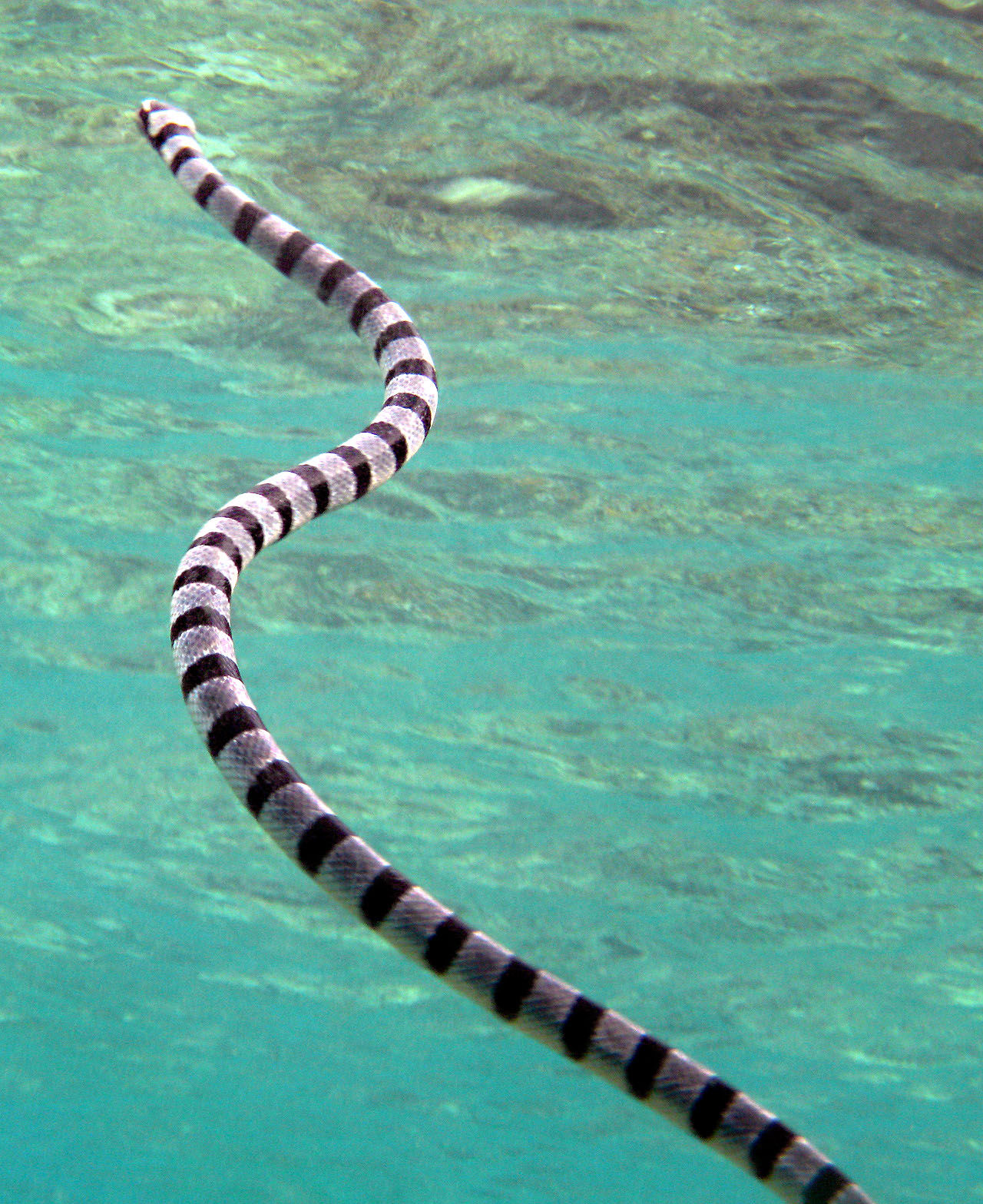
A banded sea krait (Laticauda colubrina)

== Human activities ==
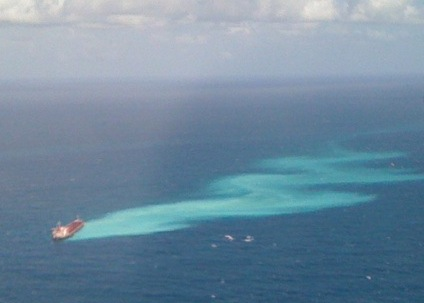
Jia Yong formerly Shen Neng 1 aground on the Great Barrier Reef on 5 April 2010

The coastal areas of the Coral Sea were populated at least 40,000 years ago by prehistoric people descending through the northern islands. Those Aboriginal tribes have been dispersed and nowadays only about 70 groups live in the area around the GBR.

The sea was the location for the Battle of the Coral Sea, a major confrontation during World War II between the navies of the Empire of Japan, and the United States and Australia. An example is the wreckage of the USS Lexington found in 2018.

Navigation has long been a traditional human activity on the Coral Sea and there are 10 major ports on the Queensland coast alone. More than 3,500 ships operated in this area in 2007, making over 9,700 voyages that transported coal, sugar, iron ore, timber, oil, chemicals, cattle and other goods. The abundance of coral reefs hinders shipping traffic, and about 50–60 accidents per year were reported between 1990 and 2007 in the GBR alone.

Other economic activities in the sea include fishing and exploration of petroleum deposits in the Gulf of Papua. The sea is also a popular tourism destination. In 2006–2007, tourism on the GBR contributed A$5.1 billion to the Australian economy. The tourism is mostly foreign or from remote parts of Australia, with a local contribution of about A$153 million. In particular, about 14.6 million visits were made to the Coral Sea reefs by the Queensland residents over 12 months in 2008. Growing concerns over the environmental effects of tourism resulted in establishment in 1975 of the Great Barrier Reef Marine Park. There are also smaller state and national parks. In 1981, the Great Barrier Reef was declared a World Heritage Site by UNESCO. From the middle of 2004, approximately one-third of the GBR Marine Park is protected from species removal of any kind, including fishing, without written permission.

It was suggested in 1923 that the Great Barrier Reef contains a major oil reservoir. After the Commonwealth Petroleum Search Subsidies Act of 1957, hydrocarbon exploration increased in Queensland, including a well drilled at Wreck Island in the southern Great Barrier Reef in 1959. In the 1960s, drilling for oil and gas was investigated throughout the Great Barrier Reef, in the Torres Strait, along "the eastern seaboard of Cape York to Princess Charlotte Bay" and along the coast from Cooktown to Fraser Island. In the late 1960s, more exploratory oil wells were drilled near Wreck Island in the Capricorn Channel, and near Darnley Island in the Torres Strait, but with no results. In the 1970s, responding to concern about oil spills, the Australian government forbade petroleum drilling on the GBR. Yet oil spills due to shipping accidents are still a threat to environment, with a total of 282 spills between 1987 and 2002.

Queensland has several major urban centres on the coast including Cairns, Townsville, Mackay, Rockhampton, Bundaberg, Sunshine Coast and the industrial city of Gladstone, which inevitably contaminate the sea. About thirty rivers and hundreds of small streams add continental water, which contains sediments, pesticides and industrial waste. Runoff is especially concerning in the region south of Cairns, as it may receive up to 4200 mm of rain per year. About 90% of sea contamination originates from land farming activities. The area is continuously urbanising, so that the population is expected to increase by 40% by 2026. As a result, 70–90% of the coastal wetlands has been lost over the past decades, and many remaining flora species are endangered.

On 3 April 2010, the Chinese ship Shen Neng 1 carrying 950 tonnes of oil, ran aground east of Rockhampton in Central Queensland, Australia, causing the 2010 Great Barrier Reef oil spill and inflicting the largest damage to the GBR and the Coral Sea so far. The scarred area was roughly 3 km (1.9 mi) long and 250 m (820 ft) wide, and some parts of it have become completely devoid of marine life. There are concerns that there could be considerable long-term damage and it will take 10 to 20 years for the reef to recover. By 13 April 2010, oil tar balls were washing up on the beaches of North West Island, a significant bird rookery and turtle nesting colony.

=== Protection ===
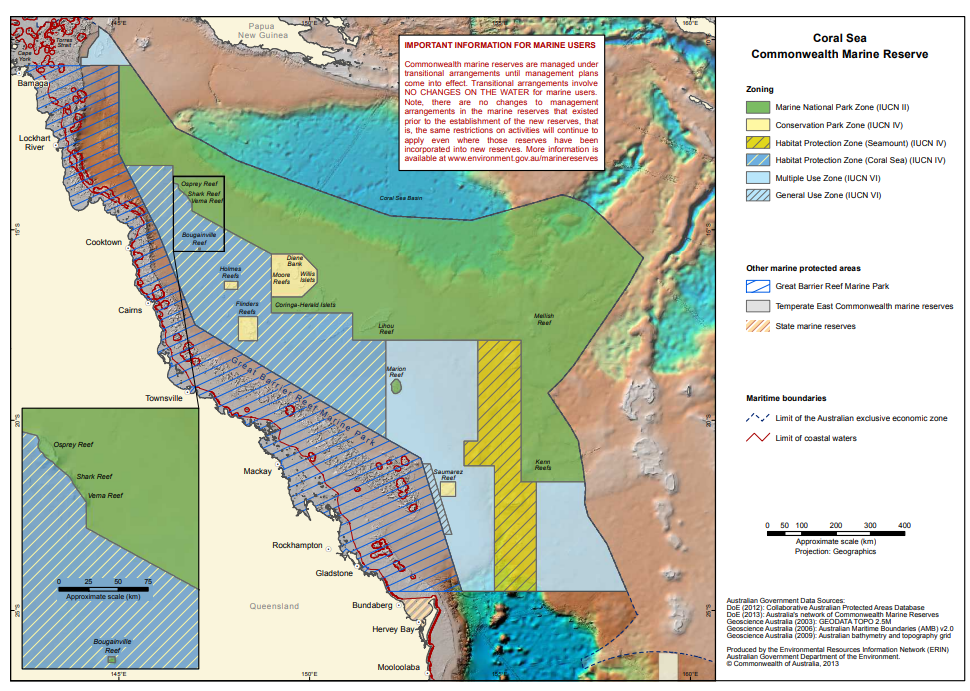
Coral Sea Marine Park 2012 proposal

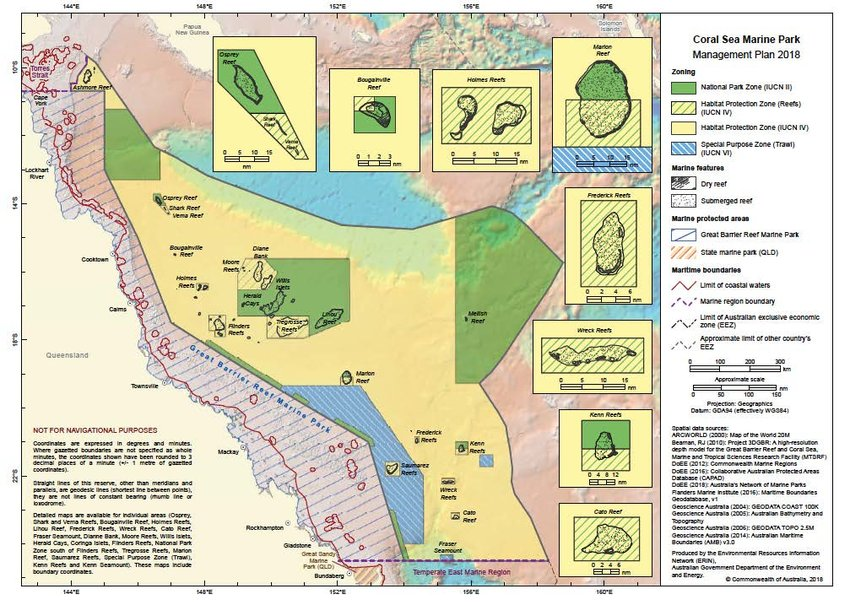
2018 Coral Sea Marine Park zoning plan

The Coral Sea Commonwealth Marine Reserve was proclaimed in December 2013, but it was not seen to offer enough protection for the environment. A group of 10 environmental NGOs came together as a coalition called the Protect our Coral Sea campaign, asking the government to create a very large highly protected Coral Sea Marine Park. In November 2011 the Australian government announced that a 989,842 square kilometres (382,180 sq mi) protected area was planned and pending approval.

The Coral Sea Commonwealth Marine Reserve was renamed as the Coral Sea Marine Park in October 2017. It covers an area of 989,836 km^{2} (382,178 sq mi) and is assigned IUCN category IV, with some area assigned IUCN categories VI, and II. It is Australia's largest single marine park and is one of the world's largest protected areas.

The Marine National Park protection (IUCN II) protected areas of the original 2012 announcement were subsequently significantly reduced from 50.78% to 24% in the 2018 management plan. This 50% reduction in protection was enacted contrary to the recommendations of then Commonwealth Government's expert review panel.

== Research ==
Before 2020, only shallow parts of Coral Sea reefs had been mapped. During 2020 some of the deepest parts of the sea were mapped using an advanced multi-beam sonar system aboard a research ship owned by the Schmidt Ocean Institute, after it was diverted from a Papua New Guinea deployment because of the pandemic. A robotic submarine sent back the first ever high-resolution footage and seafloor mapping of the vital marine protected area connecting the Great Barrier Reef to the Pacific Ocean. An area of 35,554 square kilometres (13,727 sq mi) was mapped, during 14 dives by the submarine, which went down up to 1,600 metres (5,200 ft) into the depths and spent almost 100 hours in the sea. Geoscientist Jody Webster of the University of Sydney, marine geologist Robin Beaman of James Cook University led the expedition, with colleagues controlling the diving and mapping remotely. Rare marine life was identified after the images were shared with other scientists on social media, but researchers think that some of the species captured on film could be entirely new to science. Notable finds included a species of spikefish called Hollardia goslinei, previously only seen in Hawaii, and Tosanoides bennetti, first described in 2019 and never seen alive.

== See also ==
- APNG (cable system)
- Coral Sea Islands
- Torres Strait Islands
- Willis Island

== Bibliography ==
- Hopley, David; Smithers, Scott G.; Parnell, Kevin E. (2007). The geomorphology of the Great Barrier Reef: development, diversity, and change. Cambridge University Press. ISBN 978-0-521-85302-6.
