= Jia Yong =

Chinese bulk carrier

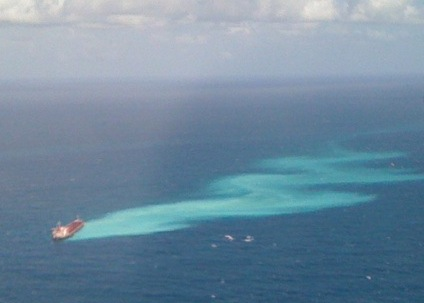
- MV Shen Neng 1 aground on the Great Barrier Reef and oil spill, April 2010

History
- Name: Jia Yong; Shen Neng 1 (2007–2012); Bestore (1993–2007)
- Owner: Scinicariello Ship Management (1993–2007); Shenzhen Energy (2007–present)
- Port of registry: China (2007–present); Italy (1993–2007)
- Builder: Sanoyas Hishino Meisho
- Launched: 24 February 1993
- Identification: Call sign: BXAN; IMO number: 9040871; MMSI number: 413461550
- Fate: Scrapped 2017

General characteristics
- Tonnage: 36,575 GT; 71,181 DWT
- Length: 225 m (738 ft) overall; 217 m (712 ft) between perpendiculars
- Beam: 32.66 m (107 ft 2 in)
- Height: 41.68 m (136 ft 9 in)
- Draught: 13.29 m (43 ft 7 in)
- Installed power: Sulzer 2SA 6RTA62 diesel engine
- Propulsion: 1 x screw propeller
- Speed: 13.5 knots (25.0 km/h; 15.5 mph)
- Crew: 23

Jia Yong, formerly MV Shen Neng 1 (simplified Chinese: 深能一号; traditional Chinese: 深能一號; pinyin: shén néng yī hào) was a Chinese bulk carrier built in 1993 as Bestore. She was sold in 2007 and renamed Shen Neng 1. In 2010, she ran aground off Great Keppel Island in Queensland, Australia, spilling oil into Great Barrier Reef waters. She was repaired and returned to service, where she operated until being scrapped in 2017.

== Construction ==
She was built as Bestore by Sanoyas Hishino Meisho in 1993 at 225 m (738 ft) long overall, with a beam of 32.66 metres (107 ft 2 in) and a draught of 13.29 metres (43 ft 7 in). Her air draught was 41.68 m (136.7 ft). The ship was powered by a 2-stroke Single Action 6-cylinder Sulzer 6RTA62 diesel engine driving a single screw propeller. The engine could propel her at 13.5 knots (25.0 km/h; 15.5 mph).

== History ==
Bestore was owned by Scinicariello Ship Management, Italy. She was sold for US$34 million in 2007, and was renamed as Shen Neng 1, meaning "Shenzhen Energy" in Chinese, when sold to Shenzhen Energy in 2007. Her callsign was BXAN. She was allocated IMO number 9040871, and the MMSI 413461550. The ship was owned by Shenzhen Energy Transportation Co. Ltd, a subsidiary of Shenzhen Energy, whose logo appeared on her funnel. She was managed by TOSCO‐KEYMAX International Ship Management Co. Ltd, a Sino-Japanese joint venture, and carried a crew of 23.

== Great Barrier Reef grounding ==
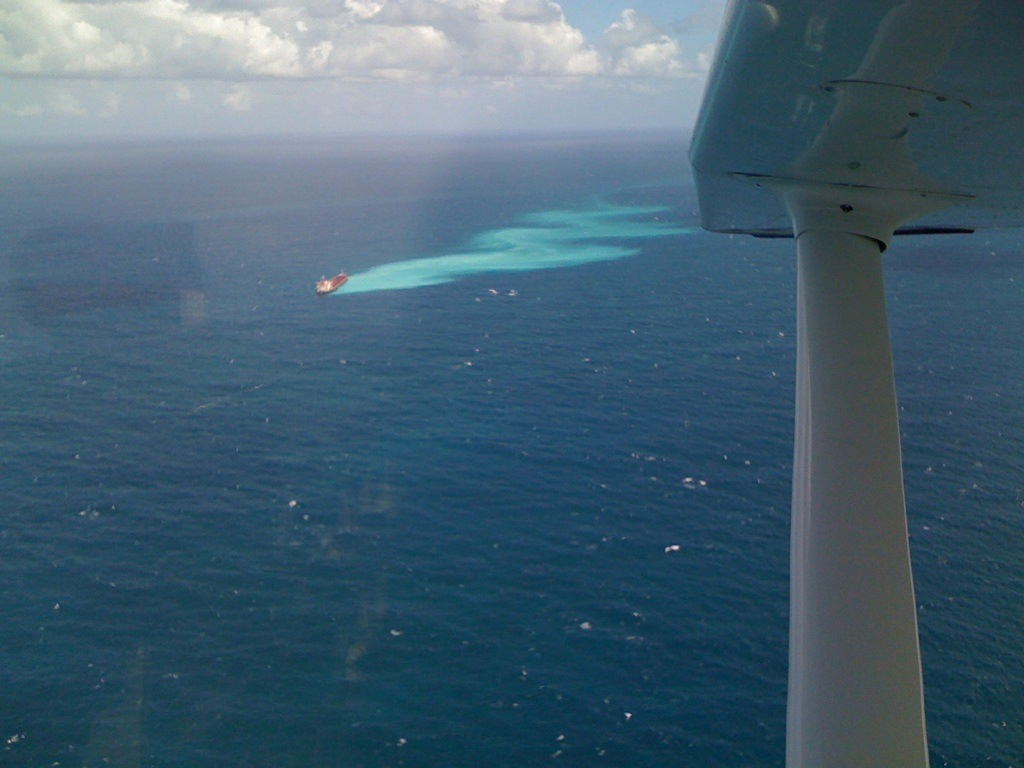
Shen Neng 1 aground on the Great Barrier Reef

On 3 April 2010, while transiting from Gladstone, Queensland, to China carrying a cargo of 65,000 tonnes of coal, Shen Neng 1 ran aground 70 kilometres (38 nmi) off Great Keppel Island, Australia, at geographic coordinates 23°06′06″S 151°38′57″E. At the time of the grounding, Shen Neng 1 was reported to have been travelling at full speed. She was severely damaged on her port side, and a 3 kilometres (1.6 nmi) long oil slick was later reported to have been seen. The ship's engine and rudder were damaged in the grounding. The ship went aground 5.8 nmi (10.7 km; 6.7 mi) outside the shipping lane. It is in a restricted area which forms part of the Great Barrier Reef Marine Park, a World Heritage Site designated by UNESCO.

As a result of the grounding, the fuel tanks of the vessel were punctured, allowing fuel oil to leak from the vessel. It was feared that the ship might break in two. 2,000 litres of the chemical dispersant Corexit 9527 was applied to the oil slick.

A salvage contract was awarded to Svitzer, led by Jan Polderman SVITZER Salvage B.V. and Drew Shannon of SVITZER Salvage Australia, who co-ordinated the salvage response. Salvage engineers from Australia and marine surveyors assisted stabilise the vessel, coordinate resources and provide expert advice to salvage masters acting at the time. Shen Neng 1 was refloated on 12 April 2010, after forecasts of bad weather meant that the salvage operation was brought forward. There were reports that large areas of the coral reef were damaged by the ship. On 14 April, the captain and officer on watch at the time of the accident were arrested. They were charged and appeared in court on 15 April.

=== Investigation ===
Two investigations have been opened into the grounding. The investigations are being conducted by the Australian Maritime Safety Authority (AMSA) and the Australian Transport Safety Bureau (ATSB). Queensland Premier Anna Bligh said that the Government would be investigating why the ship was so far off route. It was reported that the ship's owner could be fined $1,000,000 and Shen Neng 1's captain $220,000.

The ATSB despatched three investigators to Gladstone, Queensland, on 4 April to collect evidence and conduct interviews. On 6 April they boarded the ship to interview the crew members and collect further evidence. The preliminary phase of the investigation was scheduled to take 28 days. A casualty co-ordinator from the AMSA boarded the ship. Three vessels were reported as giving assistance at the scene. The preliminary investigation has found fatigue as the major contributor to the grounding. Prior to the grounding, there were no checks to ensure fatigue was minimised by the governing authorities (AMSA). A news story claimed that the ship was attempting to take a shortcut when it ran aground.

== See also ==
- List of oil spills
