= Hoskins =

Hoskins is a surname. Notable people with the surname include:

- Allen Hoskins (1920–1980), American child actor who played Farina in the Our Gang series
- Andrew Hoskins (born 1975), Canadian rower
- Anthony Hoskins (1828–1901), Royal Navy admiral and First Sea Lord
- Basil Hoskins (1929–2005), British actor
- Bert Hoskins (1885–1968), British football forward and football manager
- Bob Hoskins (1942–2014), British actor
- Bob Hoskins (American football) (1945–1980), retired National Football League defensive tackle
- Brian Hoskins (born 1945), British meteorologist and climatologist
- Brian Hoskins (born 1943), British Red Arrows Captain
- Charles Hoskins (1851-1926), Australian industrialist
- Dave Hoskins (1925–1970), American baseball pitcher in the Negro leagues and Major League Baseball
- Derrick Hoskins (born 1970), American retired National Football League defensive back
- Eric Hoskins (born 1960), Canadian physician and politician
- George Hoskins (disambiguation)
- Gregory Hoskins, vocalist and guitarist with Gregory Hoskins and the Stickpeople, a 1990s Canadian folk rock band
- Harold K. Hoskins (1927–2012), US Air Force lieutenant colonel and Tuskegee Airman
- John Hoskins (disambiguation)
- Johnnie Hoskins 1892–1987), sports promoter believed by some to have invented motorcycle speedway
- Katherine Hoskins (1909–1988), American poet, short story writer and playwright
- Kerri Hoskins (born 1970), American model
- Melissa Hoskins (born 1991), Australian track and road racing cyclist
- Oregan Hoskins, South African rugby administrator
- Patricia Hoskins (born 1967), American basketball player
- Percy Hoskins (1904–1989), British reporter
- Phil Hoskins (born 1997), American football player
- Rassie Hoskins (1862–1944), American clubwoman
- Reed Hoskins (born 1983), American college football coach
- Rhys Hoskins (born 1993), American professional baseball player
- Richard Hoskins (born 1964), British author and criminologist
- Roy Hoskins (1900–??), Australian rugby union player
- Sam Hoskins (born 1993), British footballer
- Samuel Elliott Hoskins (1799–1888), British physician
- Theodore Hoskins (born 1938), American politician
- Tom Hoskins (1864–1934), British-born Australian politician
- Will Hoskins (born 1986), British association football striker
- William Hoskins (disambiguation), multiple people, including:
  - William Hoskins (actor) (1816–1887), career in England, Australia and New Zealand
  - William Hoskins (baseball) (1914–1975), American Negro league baseball player
  - William Hoskins (inventor) (1862–1934), American co-inventor of nichrome and modern billiard chalk
  - William Hoskins (MP) for Westbury in 1555
  - William George Hoskins (1908–1992), British local historian, academic and author
  - William Lawrence Hoskins (1828–1901), American politician

== See also ==
- Hoskyns, surname
- Hoskin, surname
- Haskins (surname)
