= Hoskinson =

Hoskinson is a surname. Notable people with the surname include:

- Charles Hoskinson, American entrepreneur, founder of the Cardano blockchain platform
- Jim Hoskinson, television director
- Linda Hoskinson, elementary school teacher in Ohio, subjected to unlawful sex discrimination when she became pregnant
- Nadine Hoskinson (died 2010), popular British writer of over 40 romance novels under the pen-name Elizabeth Oldfield

== See also ==
- Murder of Vicki Lynne Hoskinson (1976–1984), 8-year-old American girl who disappeared whilst riding her bicycle
- Hoskin
- Hoskins
- Huskinson
