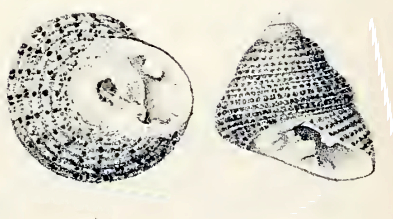
- Drawing showing two views of a shell of Clanculus robertsi

Scientific classification
- Kingdom: Animalia
- Phylum: Mollusca
- Class: Gastropoda
- Subclass: Vetigastropoda
- Order: Trochida
- Superfamily: Trochoidea
- Family: Trochidae
- Genus: Clanculus
- Species: C. robertsi

Binomial name
- Clanculus robertsi (H. Pilsbry, 1889)

Synonyms
- Trochus robertsi H. Pilsbry, 1889

= Clanculus robertsi =

Species of gastropod

Clanculus robertsi is a species of sea snail, a marine gastropod mollusk in the family Trochidae, the top snails.

== Description ==
The height of the shell attains 12.5 mm, its diameter 13 mm. This form is similar in color-pattern and sculpture to Clanculus clanguloides Wood, 1828, but differs notably in the greater altitude, the more turbinate form, and its greater development of the teeth. In these characters it is like Clanculus stigmatarius A. Adams, 1853, which is, however, quite different in coloration. The spire is elevated conical. The apex is tinged with orange. The upper whorls are nearly flat, separated by a linear suture, which becomes more deeply impressed at the body whorl. The body whorl is slightly convex, rounded at the periphery, deeply deflected and flattened toward the aperture. The base of the shell is rather flattened, about the same as in Clanculus clanguloides. The sculpture consists of spiral series of closely set rounded granules, the series or cinguli a little separated on the upper surface, closer beneath. These number 17 or 18 upon the body whorl, the 7th being upon the periphery, just as in Clanculus clanguloides. The interstices between lirae are finely obliquely and spirally striate, the spiral striae often a little difficult to distinguish. This gives the interstices at times a granulate appearance under the lens. The aperture is nearly horizontal, tetragonal. The superior lip is straightened, bearing a very large subbifid squarish tubercle in the middle. The place of the periphery is marked inside by an entering lamellar fold. The basal margin is curved, slightly expanded, bearing two or three fold-like denticles inside. Its edge is minutely denticulate. The oblique columella deeply enters the narrow umbilicus and is inserted in the center of the axis, slightly dentate above, bearing a narrow tooth below the middle, and terminating in a large, heavy bi- or triplicate tooth. The parietal area is covered by a white callus bearing numerous wrinkles, one or two of which enter the aperture. The umbilicus is surrounded by a radiately strongly plicate callus. The coloration is the same as in Clanculus clanguloides. (described as Trochus robertsi)

On old specimens, the compression and deflection of the body whorl gives the shell a bullet shape.

== Distribution ==
This marine species occurs in the Red Sea.
