= Haskins (surname) =

Haskins is a surname. Notable people with the surname include:

- Alice Haskins (1880–1971), American botanist
- Billy Jack Haskins, American football player
- Caryl Parker Haskins (1908–2001), American scientist
- Charles Haskins (disambiguation), multiple people
- Christopher Haskins (1937–2026), Irish businessman
- Clem Haskins (born 1943), American basketball player and coach
- Dennis Haskins (born 1950), American actor
- Django Haskins (born 1973), American singer-songwriter
- Don Haskins (1930–2008), American basketball coach
- Dwayne Haskins (1997–2022), American football player
- Dylan Haskins (born 1987), Irish broadcaster
- Francine Haskins (born 1947), American illustrator
- Fuzzy Haskins (1941–2023), American singer
- George Haskins (1915–1991), American legal scholar
- Gloria Arias Haskins (born 1956), American politician
- Hal Haskins (1924–2003), American basketball player
- Hassan Haskins (born 1999), American football player
- Hester Jane Haskins (??–1875), American madam
- James G. Haskins (1914-1990), politician from Botswana
- James Haskins (1941–2005), American author
- Jonas Haskins, American bass player
- Kevin Haskins (born 1960), English drummer
- Kittredge Haskins (1836–1916), American politician
- Lee Haskins (born 1983), British boxer
- Lola Haskins (born 1943), American poet
- Mark Haskins (born 1988), English wrestler
- Mark Haskins (soccer) (born 1981), South African footballer
- Michael D. Haskins (born 1942), American admiral
- Minnie Louise Haskins (1875–1957), British poet
- Reginald Haskins (1916–1999), Canadian mycologist
- Ron Haskins, American political scientist
- Sam Haskins (1926–2009), South African photographer
- Sarah Haskins (disambiguation), multiple people
- Steve Haskins (born 1958), American golfer
- Terry Haskins (1955–2000), American politician
- Thomas Haskins (born 1973), American football player
- Todd Haskins (born 1972), American soccer player
- Tyler Haskins (born 1986), American ice hockey player

== See also ==
- Haskin (surname)
- Hoskins, surname
