= List of shipwrecks in February 1888 =

The list of shipwrecks in February 1888 includes ships sunk, foundered, grounded, or otherwise lost during February 1888.

== 1 February ==
List of shipwrecks: 1 February 1888
| Ship | State | Description |
|---|---|---|
| Abercorn | United Kingdom | The barque foundered off Grays Harbor, Washington Territory with the loss of 21 lives. There was at least one survivor. |
| Hermes | United Kingdom | The schooner was abandoned in the English Channel off the coast of Cornwall with the loss of one of her four crew. Survivors were rescued by the steamship La Valette (France) Hermes was on a voyage from Cork to Exmouth, Devon. |
| Lilian | United Kingdom | The brig was abandoned in the Atlantic Ocean (44°00′N 15°05′W). Her crew were rescued by the steamship Saxonia (Germany). Lilian was on a voyage from Cardiff, Glamorgan to Imberwa, Brazil. |
| Maria | United Kingdom | The Thames barge was wrecked on the East Sand, off the coast of Kent. All three people on board were rescued by the Margate Lifeboat. |
| Planet | Germany | The steamship ran aground in the Scheldt at Hansweert, Zeeland, Netherlands. She was on a voyage from Antwerp, Belgium to Lisbon, Portugal. She was refloated with assistance. |
| Wybren Romer | Netherlands | The ship foundered in the North Sea 20 nautical miles (37 km) east of Spurn Point, Yorkshire, United Kingdom. Her crew were rescued by the tug May (United Kingdom). Wybren Romer was on a voyage from London, United Kingdom to Beauvoir. |

== 2 February ==
List of shipwrecks: 2 February 1888
| Ship | State | Description |
|---|---|---|
| Mystery | United States | The schooner was wrecked on Western Bail at Lockeport, Nova Scotia, Canada. Her crew were rescued. |
| Oithona | United Kingdom | The ship departed from Passaroeang, Netherlands East Indies for the English Channel. No further trace, reported missing. |

== 3 February ==
List of shipwrecks: 3 February 1888
| Ship | State | Description |
|---|---|---|
| HMS Resistance | Royal Navy | The armour plated hulk sank in Portchester Creek following the test of a Whitehead torpedo. |
| Wandering Minstrel | Flag unknown | The barque was wrecked on Midway Island. Her crew were rescued by Norma (Flag unknown). |

== 5 February ==
List of shipwrecks: 5 February 1888
| Ship | State | Description |
|---|---|---|
| Ann Millicent | United Kingdom | The ship was lost off Timor, Netherlands East Indies. She was on a voyage from the Gulf of Carpentaria to Adelaide, South Australia. |
| Thomas M. Reed | United Kingdom | The ship was destroyed by fire at Liverpool, Lancashire. |

== 7 February ==
List of shipwrecks: 7 February 1888
| Ship | State | Description |
|---|---|---|
| Virginie | Flag unknown | The ship caught fire in the Atlantic Ocean. |

== 9 February ==
List of shipwrecks: 9 February 1888
| Ship | State | Description |
|---|---|---|
| Pinnas | United Kingdom | The steamer sank, after hitting the sunken steamer Saltburn while entering Sunderland harbour. Vessels to the value of approximately £40,000 have sunk here. |
| Rhodora | United Kingdom | The steamship was severely damaged by an onboard explosion off "Corrent Island", in the Mediterranean Sea (35°20′N 15°23′E). She was in a voyage from Cardiff, Glamorgan to Port Said, Egypt. She was towed in to Messina, Sicily, Italy by the steamship Castor (Netherlands). |
| Spearman | United Kingdom | The 1,345 ton North Shields steamer sank, while at anchor, after being rundown by an unnamed vessel. |

== 10 February ==
List of shipwrecks: 10 February 1888
| Ship | State | Description |
|---|---|---|
| Rising Star | United States | The schooner was wrecked at Rye Beach. Her crew were rescued. |

== 12 February ==
List of shipwrecks: 12 February 1888
| Ship | State | Description |
|---|---|---|
| Adelina | France | The brigantine was driven ashore and wrecked at Palamós, Spain. Her crew were rescued. She was on a voyage from Cardiff, Glamorgan, United Kingdom to Nice, Alpes-Maritimes. |

== 13 February ==
List of shipwrecks: 13 February 1888
| Ship | State | Description |
|---|---|---|
| Ole Bull | Norway | The steamship ran aground and sank at "Esketh". All on board were rescued. |

== 14 February ==
List of shipwrecks: 14 February 1888
| Ship | State | Description |
|---|---|---|
| Winifred | United Kingdom | The ship ran aground on the Inner Binks, off the mouth of the Humber. Her five crew were rescued by the Spurn Lifeboat. Winifred was on a voyage from London to Aberdeen. She was subsequently towed in to Grimsby, Lincolnshire. |

== 15 February ==
List of shipwrecks: 15 February 1888
| Ship | State | Description |
|---|---|---|
| Ashurst | United Kingdom | The steamship foundered in the Bristol Channel between Hartland Point and Lundy Island, Devon. Her crew were rescued by the barquentine Barry (United Kingdom). |

== 16 February ==
List of shipwrecks: 16 February 1888
| Ship | State | Description |
|---|---|---|
| J.M.K. | United Kingdom | The schooner ran aground in the Pembroke River. |
| Ragna | Norway | The ship departed from Grimsby, Lincolnshire, United Kingdom for Montevideo, Uruguay and Buenos Aires, Argentina. No further trace, reported missing. |

== 17 February ==
List of shipwrecks: 17 February 1888
| Ship | State | Description |
|---|---|---|
| Eastminster | United Kingdom | The full-rigged ship departed from Maryborough, Queensland for Newcastle, New South Wales. She presumably sank in a cyclone that struck the area soon afterward. Her wreckage was found on a coral reef in the Capricorn and Bunker Group in the Coral Sea approximately 100 nautical miles (190 km; 120 mi) east of Rockhampton, Queensland. |
| Geelong | United Kingdom | The steamship was run ashore on Carlisle Island, Queensland after losing her cable in a hurricane. Two of her crew were lost, but the remainder and all 13 passengers were rescued. She was on a voyage from Townsville to Brisbane. |

== 18 February ==
List of shipwrecks: 18 February 1888
| Ship | State | Description |
|---|---|---|
| Adolphe Louise Protegée | France | The fishing smack was run into by Marion Ross (United Kingdom) and sank in the English Channel 15 nautical miles (28 km) off Beachy Head, Sussex, United Kingdom. Her crew were rescued by Marion Ross. |
| Leverington | United Kingdom | The steamship was damaged by an onboard explosion. She was on a voyage from Cardiff, Glamorgan to Shoreham-by-Sea, Sussex. |
| Nellie | (United Kingdom of Great Britain and Ireland) Jersey | The ketch was run into by the tug Wellington ( (United Kingdom of Great Britain and Ireland) Jersey) and sank at Guernsey, Channel Islands. |

== 19 February ==
List of shipwrecks: 19 February 1888
| Ship | State | Description |
|---|---|---|
| Hajeen | Flag unknown | The steamship ran aground in the Suez Canal. |

== 20 February ==
List of shipwrecks: 20 February 1888
| Ship | State | Description |
|---|---|---|
| Daisy | United Kingdom | The ship ran aground in the River Usk. She was on a voyage from Newport, Monmouthshire to Pará, Brazil. |
| European | United Kingdom | The steamship ran aground in the Suez Canal. |
| Zebrina | United Kingdom | The ship ran aground on the Pye Sand, in the North Sea off the coast of Essex. She was on a voyage from Whitstable, Kent to Newcastle upon Tyne, Northumberland. |

== 21 February ==
List of shipwrecks: 21 February 1888
| Ship | State | Description |
|---|---|---|
| Annie Christian | United Kingdom | The schooner was run into by the steamship Mersey (United Kingdom) and sank in the River Mersey Her crew were rescued. |

== 22 February ==
List of shipwrecks: 22 February 1888
| Ship | State | Description |
|---|---|---|
| Dayot | French Navy | The unprotected cruiser foundered in a cyclone at Tamatave, Madagascar. |
| Irene | Germany | The schooner was wrecked in a cyclone at Tamatave. |
| Seven unnamed vessels | United Kingdom | The coasters were wrecked in a cyclone at Tamatave. |
| Two unnamed vessels | Flags unknown | The ships were wrecked in a cyclone at Tamatave. |

== 23 February ==
List of shipwrecks: 23 February 1888
| Ship | State | Description |
|---|---|---|
| Kater R. Jones | United Kingdom | The steamship was driven ashore at Cardiff, Glamorgan. |

== 24 February ==
List of shipwrecks: 24 February 1888
| Ship | State | Description |
|---|---|---|
| Ransom | United States | The whaler, a barque, was wrecked on Molokai, Kingdom of Hawaii in a hurricane with the loss of all hands, about 40 lives. |
| Rhosina | United Kingdom | The steamship ran aground at Odesa, Russia. |

== 25 February ==
List of shipwrecks: 25 February 1888
| Ship | State | Description |
|---|---|---|
| Hesperus | Sweden | The brigantine was abandoned at sea. Her crew were rescued by the steamship Minerva (United Kingdom). Hesperus was on a voyage from "Aquilas" to Leith, Lothian, United Kingdom. |
| Inchbroom | United Kingdom | The schooner ran aground and sank on the North Bull, in the Irish Sea off the coast of County Dublin. |
| Nellie Bowers | United States | The schooner was lost near Richmond's Island, Maine, with the loss of at least 2 crewmen. |

== 27 February ==
List of shipwrecks: 27 February 1888
| Ship | State | Description |
|---|---|---|
| Julia | United States | The ferry suffered a boiler explosion at South Vallejo, California and was destroyed by fire. The fire also destroyed 600 feet (180 m) of the wharf, large vats of petroleum, the telegraph office, and freight depot. 30 to 40 people were killed and 14 were wounded. |
| Ottowa | United Kingdom | The steamship was driven ashore at "Elalgrat", Spain. She was refloated the next day. |

== Unknown date ==
List of shipwrecks: Unknown date in February 1888
| Ship | State | Description |
|---|---|---|
| Aagot | Norway | The ship was driven ashore 2 nautical miles (3.7 km) north north east of Zuydcoote, Nord, France. Her crew were rescued She was on a voyage from Mandal to Cardiff, Glamorgan, United Kingdom. |
| A. E. Killan | United Kingdom | The ship arrive at Iquique, Chile on fire and was beached. She was severely damaged. |
| Arch Druid | United Kingdom | The steamship ran aground in the Danube at "Doanaslau", Romania. She was on a voyage from Constanţa, Romania to an English port. She was later refloated. |
| Ardgay | United Kingdom | The ship was driven ashore at Cape Bontagan, China. Her crew were rescued. She was on a voyage from Hong Kong to Bangkok, Siam. |
| Bacilia | Flag unknown | The steamship ran aground at Maassluis, South Holland, Netherlands. She was on a voyage from Benisaf, Algeria to Rotterdam, South Holland. |
| Booldana | United Kingdom | The steamship collided with the steamship Afrika (Germany) in the Hooghly River and ran aground. |
| Caterina G. | Italy | The brig ran aground at "Pasoglobo", Argentina and sank. She was on a voyage from Cardiff to Rosario, Argentina. |
| Charlotte of Derby | Norway | The barque ran aground on the Haisborough Sands, in the North Sea off the coast of Norfolk, United Kingdom. She was refloated and beached at Great Yarmouth, Norfolk. |
| Commonwealth | United Kingdom | The steamship ran aground south of Amack, Denmark. She was refloated and taken in to Copenhagen, Denmark. |
| Corinthian | United Kingdom | The steamship's boiler exploded, killing seven of the crew and sinking while on a voyage from Veracruz to New York. The surviving crew, took to the boats and landed at Galveston, Texas. |
| Dorothea | Russia | The schooner ran aground on the Maplin Sands, in the North Sea off the coast of Essex, United Kingdom. She was refloated and towed in to London, United Kingdom. |
| Elizabeth and Charlotte | United Kingdom | The smack was driven ashore and wrecked at Garton, Yorkshire. Her crew were rescued. |
| Esterel | United Kingdom | The steam yacht was run into by the steamship Aurora (United Kingdom) off Santa Maura, Greece and was severely damaged. |
| Excellent, Memling, and St. Asaph | United Kingdom | The steamship Excellent collided with the steamships St. Asaph and Memling at Gibraltar and sank. Excellent was on a voyage from Messina, Sicily, Italy to Philadelphia, Pennsylvania, United States. St. Asaph was severely damaged. She was taken in to Gibraltar in a waterlogged condition. Memling was severely damaged and was beached. She was on a voyage from Agrigenti Sicily to London. |
| Fairmount | United States | The ship was driven ashore at Bay Head, New Jersey. She was on a voyage from Antwerp, Belgium to New York. She was refloated with assistance and completed her voyage. |
| Favourite | United Kingdom | The schooner was wrecked at Pará, Brazil. |
| Grey Eagle | United States | The barque was driven ashore and wrecked at Cape Henry, Virginia. She was on a voyage from Rio de Janeiro, Brazil to Baltimore, Maryland. |
| Haddington | United Kingdom | The barque was destroyed by fire in the Indian Ocean. Her crew were rescued. She was on a voyage from Chittagong, India to New York. |
| Harriet Upham | United Kingdom | The ship was abandoned at sea. Her crew were rescued. She was on a voyage from Montevideo, Uruguay to Aracaju, Brazil. |
| Imbs | Norway | The steamship ran aground on the Caloot Bank, in the North Sea off the cost of Zeeland, Netherlands. She was on a voyage from Havre de Grâce, Seine-Inférieure, France to Antwerp. |
| Ipselen | Norway | The brig was wrecked on the Whittaker Sand, in the North Sea off the coast of Essex. Her nine crew were rescued by the Clacton Lifeboat. She was on a voyage from Christiania to Lowestoft, Suffolk, United Kingdom. |
| John Banfield | United Kingdom | The barque was driven ashore near Mazzara, Sicily. She was on a voyage from Newcastle upon Tyne, Northumberland to Trapani, Sicily. |
| Kate | United Kingdom | The ship was run into by a steamship and sank in the River Thames at Woolwich, Kent. Her crew survived. She was on a voyage from Portland, Dorset to Pimlico, Middlesex. |
| Lady Catherine | United Kingdom | The steamship was driven ashore in the Thames Estuary 1 nautical mile (1.9 km) downstream of the Chapman Head Lighthouse. She was refloated on 26 February and sailed upstream. |
| Laila | United Kingdom | The barque was abandoned at sea. Her crew were rescued. She was on a voyage from Little Gisce Bay to Saint John, New Brunswick, Canada. |
| Lesbian | United Kingdom | The steamship ran aground at "Bulgar", Ottoman Empire. She was on a voyage from Constantinople, Ottoman Empire to Liverpool, Lancashire. |
| Loch Ken | United Kingdom | The ship ran aground on the South Sand Head, off the coast of Kent. Five people were rescued by the lugger Champion (United Kingdom). Loch Ken was on a voyage from Middlesbrough, Yorkshire to the Natal Colony. She was refloated. |
| Maine et Loire | France | The steamship was wrecked in the Banana Islands, Sierra Leone. Her crew were rescued. |
| Marcia C. Day | United States | The ship was driven ashore at Arromanches, Calvados, France. She was on a voyage from Havre de Grâce to New York. |
| Mary Ann | United Kingdom | The ship was driven ashore and wrecked at Port Elizabeth, Cape Colony. |
| Mascotte | United States | The barque was driven ashore at Philadelphia. |
| Merton | United Kingdom | The schooner was driven ashore and wrecked at Saltfleethaven, Lincolnshire. Her crew survived. She was on a voyage from Sunderland, County Durham to Lymington, Hampshire. |
| Myrtle, and Progress | United Kingdom | The smacks collided in the North Sea. Both vessels sank. Their crews were rescued. |
| Nairnshire | United Kingdom | The barque ran aground on the Scar Bank, in Loch Ryan. She was refloated and taken in to Cairnryan, Wigtownshire. |
| Nilo | Austria-Hungary | The brig was driven ashore at Balerma, Spain. She was on a voyage from Marseille, Bouches-du-Rhône, France to Buenos Aires, Argentina. She was a total loss. |
| Occident | Germany | The barque was driven ashore and wrecked at Maracaibo, Venezuela. |
| Otterhound | United Kingdom | The yacht was run into by the steamship Aurora (Austria-Hungary) off Corfu Greece and was severely damaged. |
| Perseverance | United Kingdom | The brigantine was driven ashore and severely damaged at Seaham, County Durham. She was on a voyage from Chichester, Sussex to Seaham. |
| Ponca | United Kingdom | The steamship ran aground off Cape Henlopen, Delaware, United States. |
| Progress | Norway | The schooner was driven ashore between Le Crotoy and Saint-Valery-sur-Somme, Somme, France. She was on a voyage from Farsund to Abbeville, Somme. She was refloated and towed in to port in a waterlogged condition. |
| Queen | United Kingdom | The steamship caught fire at sea whilst on a voyage from Galveston, Texas to Bremerhaven, Germany. The fire was extinguished and she completed her voyage on 10 February. |
| Richard Fisher | United Kingdom | The schooner was driven ashore at Gravesend, Kent. |
| Salisbury | Germany | The barque was abandoned off Cape Flattery, Washington Territory. All on board were rescued. She was on a voyage from Port Townsend, Washington Territory to Montevideo. |
| Skjold | Denmark | The barque collided with the brigantine Abis (Germany) at Maracaibo and was severely damaged. |
| Strathmore | United Kingdom | The steamship ran aground in the Narrow Straits, in the Red Sea. |
| Swatow | China | The steamship struck rocks at Swatow and foundered. |
| Tiger | Flag unknown | The steamship ran aground on the Schuitezand, in the Zuyder Zee. She was on a voyage from Amsterdam, North Holland, Netherlands to Bremen, Germany. |
| Two Sisters | United Kingdom | The ketch was driven ashore in the River Thames at Tilbury, Essex. |
| Venus | Germany | The brigantine was driven ashore at Maracaibo. She was refloated. |
| Weasel | (United Kingdom of Great Britain and Ireland) Jersey | The schooner was wrecked on Paxos, Greece. Her crew survived. She was on a voyage from Corfuto Rouen, Seine-Inférieure. |
| Winchester | United States | The ship was damaged by fire at Bermuda, Arson was suspected. |
| W. M. Mackay | United Kingdom | The schooner was run into by the steamship City of Truro (United Kingdom) and sank in Long Island Sound. |
| Ypapanti | Greece | The schooner was destroyed by fire off Marseille. Her crew were rescued. |
| Zephyr | United Kingdom | The ship ran aground on the Media Suna Rocks. Her crew were rescued. She was on a voyage from Trinidad to Falmouth, Cornwall. She was a total loss. |
| Unnamed | Flag unknown | The ship ran aground on rocks off the coast of Calvados, France. |
| Unnamed | Denmark | The brig ran aground at the Point of Ayr, Cheshire, United Kingdom. |
| Unnamed | Flag unknown | The steamship ran aground on the Gunfleet Sand, in the North Sea off the coast of Essex. |
| Unnamed | Flag unknown | The vessel, carrying 2,000 tons of coal, was completely destroyed at Bramley-Moore Dock, Liverpool. |
