= Hoskyns =

Hoskyns is a surname. Notable people with the surname include:

- Anthony Leigh Egerton Hoskyns-Abrahall (1903–1982), Anglican Bishop of Lancaster
- Barney Hoskyns (born 1959), British music critic
- Bennet Hoskyns, MP for Hereford 1645 and 1654
- Bill Hoskyns (1931–2013), British Olympic fencer
- Chandos Wren-Hoskyns (1812–1876), English landowner
- Sir Edwyn Hoskyns, 12th Baronet (1851–1925)
- Sir Edwyn Hoskyns, 13th Baronet (1884–1937)
- Sir John Hoskyns, 2nd Baronet (1634–1705), baronet and one of the founders of the Royal Society
- Sir John Hoskyns, 9th Baronet (1817–1911) of the Hoskyns baronets
- Sir John Hoskyns, 15th Baronet (1926–1956), English cricketer, British Army officer, barrister and clergyman
- Sir John Hoskyns (policy advisor) (1927–2014), policy advisor to Margaret Thatcher (1979–1982)

== See also ==
- Hoskyns Group
- Hoskyns Baronets
- Hoskyn Islands, Australia
- Hoskin, surname
- Hoskins, surname
