= Lubbockichthys myersi =

Conservation status
- Data Deficient (IUCN 3.1)

Scientific classification
- Kingdom: Animalia
- Phylum: Chordata
- Class: Actinopterygii
- Division: Teleostei
- Order: Blenniiformes
- Family: Pseudochromidae
- Genus: Lubbockichthys
- Species: L. myersi

Binomial name
- Lubbockichthys myersi A.C.Gill & Edwards, 2004

Species of fish

Lubbockichthys myersi, the Guam pencil dottyback, is a species of marine ray-finned fish belonging to the family Pseudochromidae, the dottybacks. This species is known only from the waters around Guam.

== Taxonomy ==
Lubbockichthys myersi was first formally described in 2004 by the ichthyologists Anthony C. Gill and Alasdair J. Edwards with its type locality given as off the Orote Peninsula, inside Blue Hole, Guam, Mariana Islands, western Pacific, from a depth of 29 m (95 ft). The genus Lubbockichthys is classified in the subfamily Pseudoplesiopinae of the dottyback family Pseudochromidae. The dottybacks are classified within the order Blenniformes, with the clingfishes, damselfishes and the blennies.

== Etymology ==
Lubbockichthys myersi is placed in the genus Lubbockichthys, a name which suffixes the Greek word for "Fish", -ichthys, onto the surname Lubbock in honour of Roger Lubbock, who studied dottyback systematics before his death in a car crash near Rio de Janeiro in 1981, just before his 30th birthday. The specific name honors Robert F. Myers, a coral-reef biologist and underwater photographer, who collected the type specimen.

== Description ==
Lubbockichthys myersi is a small-sized fish which reaches a standard length of 3.9 cm (1.5 in). There are 2 spines and 26 soft rays in the dorsal fin and 2 spines and 15 soft rays in the anal fin. The Guam pencil dottyback is distinguished from its congeners in being very slender, its greatest body depth is 15.8% of its standard length and its depth at the origin of its dorsal fin is 15.3% of its standard length. This species alo has a greater number of vertebrae, 32, than its congeners. The holotype had a lavender head with pink markings, the iris is vermilion with dark blue lines over and underneath the pupil. The front two-thirds of the body is lavender, pinker towards the back and underside, becoming yellow towards the rear. The caudal fin is bright yellow at its base and hyaline distally, the dorsal and anal fins have lavender bases with the rest of the fins being hyaline. The paired fins are pinkish hyaline and lavender.

== Distribution and habitat ==
Lubbockichthys myersi has only been found in the waters off Guam where it is found near caves in which it shelters if approached.

== Conservation status ==
Lubbockichthys myersi is known from one specimen, the holotype, in a which is in the Natural History Museum, London, although there are a few additional sight records. Very little is known about its biology, ecology, population and any threats to this species so the International Union for Conservation of Nature has classified it as Data Deficient.
