= Bugeye dottyback =

Conservation status
- Least Concern (IUCN 3.1)

Scientific classification
- Kingdom: Animalia
- Phylum: Chordata
- Class: Actinopterygii
- Order: Blenniiformes
- Family: Pseudochromidae
- Subfamily: Pseudoplesiopinae
- Genus: Amsichthys; A. C. Gill & A. J. Edwards, 1999
- Species: A. knighti

Binomial name
- Amsichthys knighti Allen, 1987

Synonyms
- Pseudoplesiops knighti Allen, 1987

Species of fish

The bugeye dottyback (Amsichthys knighti), also known as Knight's dottyback, is a species of ray-finned fish, the only species in the monospecific genus Amsichthys, belonging to the subfamily Pseudoplesiopinae, of the family Pseudochromidae. It is found in the Indo-Pacific region.

== Description ==
The bugeye dottyback is a small, rarely seen species of dottyback which varies in colour from a uniform yellow through to brown. It has a pinkish snout and brown individuals have a yellow caudal fin. It goes to a maximum total length of 4.5 centimetres (1.8 in) in males.

== Distribution ==
The bugeye dottyback is found in the Indo-Pacific region from western Thailand east through the Malay Archipelago to the Solomon Islands and Wallis Island, south to northern Australia and north to southern Japan. In Australia it is distributed from Scott Reef in Western Australia to the Capricorn Islands in Queensland.

== Biology ==
The bugeye dottyback occurs in coastal reef slopes where it inhabits areas of algal growth among boulders down to depths of 20 metres (66 ft) and it is also found in inshore reefs. It is a secretive and shy species which is most often recorded when piscicides are used to collect specimens.

== Name ==
The genus name compounds the initials of the Australian Museum, Sydney, the "AMS" with the greek word for "fish@, ichthys, Amsichthys. The specific name honours Ronald Knight, Sr. of Manus, Papua New Guinea, who provided hospitality to Gerald R. Allen when he was on a collecting trip in 1982. The location the type specimen was collected was the Ribbon Reef, part of the Great Barrier Reef.
