= Huskins =

Huskins is a surname. Notable people with the surname include:

- Kent Huskins (born 1979), Canadian hockey player
- Jeff Huskins, American country musician
- Charles Leonard Huskins (1897–1953), English-Canadian geneticist
- J. Frank Huskins (1911–1995), associate justice
- Rachel Huskins (2000-current), domestic violence activist and social media personality

== See also ==
- Haskins (surname)
