= William Hoskins =

William or Bill Hoskins may refer to:

- William Hoskins (MP) for Westbury in 1555
- William Lawrence Hoskins (1828–1901), American politician
- William Hoskins (actor) (1816–1887), career in England, Australia and New Zealand
- William Hoskins (inventor) (1862–1934), American co-inventor of nichrome and modern billiard chalk
- W. G. Hoskins (William George Hoskins, 1908–1992), English local historian, academic and author
- Bill Hoskins (baseball) (1914–1975), American Negro league baseball player
- Will Hoskins (born 1986), English association football striker

== See also ==
- William Hosking, writer and architect
