= Chlidichthys abruptus =

Scientific classification
- Domain: Eukaryota
- Kingdom: Animalia
- Phylum: Chordata
- Class: Actinopterygii
- Order: Blenniiformes
- Family: Pseudochromidae
- Genus: Chlidichthys
- Species: C. abruptus

Binomial name
- Chlidichthys abruptus Lubbock, 1977

Species of fish

Chlidichthys abruptus, or St Brandon's dottyback, is a species of fish in the family Pseudochromidae.

== Description ==
Chlidichthys abruptus is a small-sized fish which grows up to 4.7 cm (1.9 in).

== Distribution and habitat ==
Chlidichthys abruptus is endemic to an archipelago called the Cargados Carajos Shoals in the Indian Ocean.
