= Chlidichthys auratus =

Scientific classification
- Domain: Eukaryota
- Kingdom: Animalia
- Phylum: Chordata
- Class: Actinopterygii
- Order: Blenniiformes
- Family: Pseudochromidae
- Genus: Chlidichthys
- Species: C. auratus

Binomial name
- Chlidichthys auratus Lubbock, 1975

Species of fish

Chlidichthys auratus, the golden dottyback, is a species of fish in the family Pseudochromidae.

== Description ==
Chlidichthys auratus is a small-sized fish which grows up to 3.9 cm (1.5 in).

== Distribution and habitat ==
Chlidichthys auratus is from the Red Sea.
