= Chlidichthys smithae =

Scientific classification
- Kingdom: Animalia
- Phylum: Chordata
- Class: Actinopterygii
- Order: Blenniiformes
- Family: Pseudochromidae
- Genus: Chlidichthys
- Species: C. smithae

Binomial name
- Chlidichthys smithae Lubbock, 1977

Species of fish

Chlidichthys smithae is a species of fish in the family Pseudochromidae.

== Description ==
Chlidichthys smithae is a small-sized fish which grows up to 3.4 cm (1.3 in).

== Distribution and habitat ==
Chlidichthys smithae is found near Mauritius in the Indian Ocean.

== Etymology ==
The fish is named in honor of Margaret Mary Smith (1916-1987), who was the first director of the J. L. B. Smith Institute of Ichthyology which is now the South African Institute for Aquatic Biodiversity. Smith helped collect the type specimen.
