= Chlidichthys chagosensis =

Scientific classification
- Kingdom: Animalia
- Phylum: Chordata
- Class: Actinopterygii
- Order: Blenniiformes
- Family: Pseudochromidae
- Genus: Chlidichthys
- Species: C. chagosensis

Binomial name
- Chlidichthys chagosensis A.C.Gill & Edwards, 2004

Species of fish

Chlidichthys chagosensis, the Chagos dottyback, is a species of fish in the family Pseudochromidae.

== Description ==
Chlidichthys chagosensis is a small-sized fish which grows up to 3.1 cm (1.2 in).

== Distribution and habitat ==
Chlidichthys chagosensis is found only in the Western Indian Ocean from the Chagos Archipelago.
