= Lubbockichthys multisquamatus =

Scientific classification
- Domain: Eukaryota
- Kingdom: Animalia
- Phylum: Chordata
- Class: Actinopterygii
- Order: Blenniiformes
- Family: Pseudochromidae
- Genus: Lubbockichthys
- Species: L. multisquamatus

Binomial name
- Lubbockichthys multisquamatus G. R. Allen, 1987

Synonyms
- Pseudoplesiops multisquamatus Allen, 1987; Lubbochichthys multisquamatus (Allen, 1987); Pseudoplesiops multisquamata Allen, 1987

Species of fish

Lubbockichthys multisquamatus, the fine-scaled dottyback, is a species of fish in the family Pseudochromidae.

== Description ==
Lubbockichthys multisquamatus is a small-sized fish which grows up to 7.5 cm (3.0 in).

== Distribution and habitat ==
Lubbockichthys multisquamatus is found throughout the eastern Indian Ocean and into the central Pacific.
