= Pseudoplesiops wassi =

Conservation status
- Least Concern (IUCN 3.1)

Scientific classification
- Kingdom: Animalia
- Phylum: Chordata
- Class: Actinopterygii
- Order: Blenniiformes
- Family: Pseudochromidae
- Genus: Pseudoplesiops
- Species: P. wassi

Binomial name
- Pseudoplesiops wassi Gill & Edwards, 2003

Species of fish

Pseudoplesiops wassi, the fleckfin dottyback or Wass's dottyback, is a species of dottyback fish. It is found associated with coral reefs and other rocky coastal habitats in a large part of the south-western Pacific including the Great Barrier Reef, the Coral Sea, the Caroline Islands, the Bismarck Archipelago, Vanuatu, Fiji, Rotuma, Tonga, Samoa, and the Solomon Islands. The specific name honours the fisheries biologist Richard C. Wass.

This rather variable but always brilliantly coloured species shares with Pseudoplesiops collare a higher number (14) of precaudal vertebrae than other members of the genus and differs markedly from that species in colour, having prominent blue spots at the base of the dorsal and anal fins. Pseudoplesiops wassi grows to around 30 mm standard length.
