= Chlidichthys foudioides =

Scientific classification
- Kingdom: Animalia
- Phylum: Chordata
- Class: Actinopterygii
- Order: Blenniiformes
- Family: Pseudochromidae
- Genus: Chlidichthys
- Species: C. foudioides

Binomial name
- Chlidichthys foudioides A.C.Gill & Edwards, 2004

Species of fish

Chlidichthys foudioides, the Fody dottyback, is a species of fish in the family Pseudochromidae.

== Description ==
Chlidichthys foudioides is a small-sized fish which grows up to 4.0 cm (1.6 in).

== Distribution and habitat ==
Chlidichthys foudioides is found only in Rodrigues Island in the Western Indian Ocean.
