= Pectinochromis =

Scientific classification
- Kingdom: Animalia
- Phylum: Chordata
- Class: Actinopterygii
- Order: Blenniiformes
- Family: Pseudochromidae
- Subfamily: Pseudoplesiopinae
- Genus: Pectinochromis; A. C. Gill & A. J. Edwards, 1999
- Species: P. lubbocki

Binomial name
- Pectinochromis lubbocki Allen, 1987

Synonyms
- Pseudoplesiops lubbocki A.J. Edwards & Randall, 1983

Genus of fishes

Pectinochromis is a monospecific genus of ray-finned fish from the subfamily Pseudoplesiopinae in the family Pseudochromidae, the dottybacks. The only species in the genus is Pectinochromis lubbocki, a small reef living dottyback from the Red Sea. This genus is the sister taxon to the genus Chlidichthys. The specific name honours the Cambridge University ichthyologist Roger Lubbock (1951–1981), in recognition of his work on the taxonomy of the subfamily Pseudoplesiopinae.
