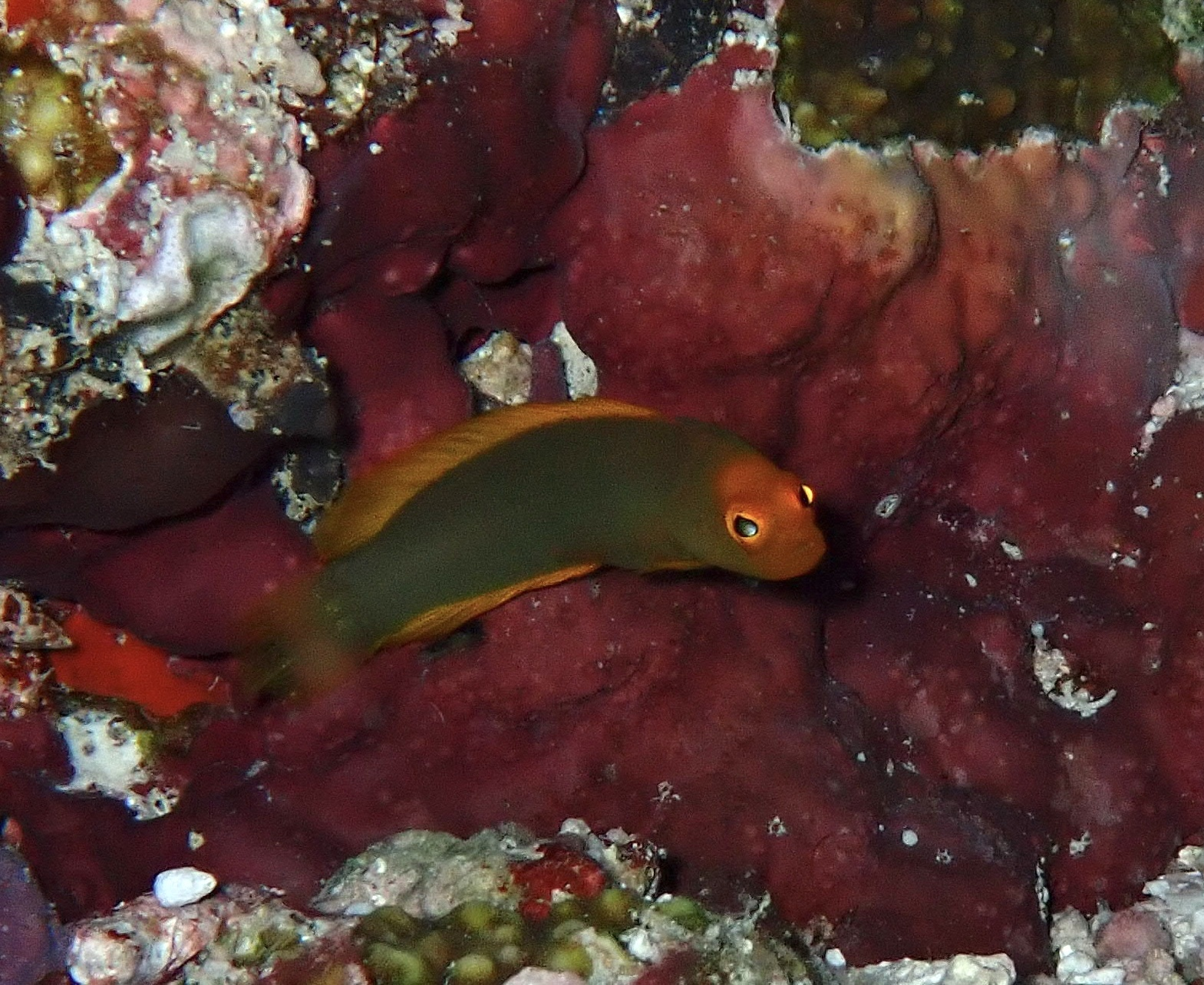

Scientific classification
- Kingdom: Animalia
- Phylum: Chordata
- Class: Actinopterygii
- Order: Blenniiformes
- Family: Pseudochromidae
- Subfamily: Pseudoplesiopinae
- Genus: Chlidichthys; J. L. B. Smith, 1953

Type species
- Chlidichthys johnvoelckeri J. L. B. Smith, 1953

= Chlidichthys =

Genus of fishes

Chlidichthys is a genus of ray-finned fishes from the western and central Indian Ocean, it is part of the subfamily Pseudoplesiopinae which in turn is a constituent subfamily of the dottyback family, the Pseudochromidae. Within the Pseudoplesiopinae, Chlidichthys is regarded as a sister taxon to Pectinochromis.

== Species ==
The following species are classified in the genus Chlidichthys:

- Chlidichthys abruptus Lubbock, 1977 (St Brandon's dottyback)
- Chlidichthys auratus Lubbock, 1975 (Golden dottyback)
- Chlidichthys bibulus (J. L. B. Smith, 1954) (Nosey dottyback)
- Chlidichthys cacatuoides A. C. Gill & Randall, 1994 (Cockatoo dottyback)
- Chlidichthys chagosensis A.C.Gill & Edwards, 2004 (Chagos dottyback)
- Chlidichthys clibanarius A.C.Gill & Edwards, 2004 (Chainmail dottyback)
- Chlidichthys foudioides A.C.Gill & Edwards, 2004 (Fody dottyback)
- Chlidichthys inornatus Lubbock, 1976
- Chlidichthys johnvoelckeri J. L. B. Smith, 1953 (Cerise dottyback)
- Chlidichthys pembae J. L. B. Smith, 1954
- Chlidichthys randalli Lubbock, 1977
- Chlidichthys rubiceps Lubbock, 1975
- Chlidichthys smithae Lubbock, 1977
