= Chlidichthys pembae =

Scientific classification
- Kingdom: Animalia
- Phylum: Chordata
- Class: Actinopterygii
- Order: Blenniiformes
- Family: Pseudochromidae
- Genus: Chlidichthys
- Species: C. pembae

Binomial name
- Chlidichthys pembae (J. L. B. Smith, 1954)

Species of fish

Chlidichthys pembae is a species of fish in the family Pseudochromidae.

== Description ==
Chlidichthys pembae is a small-sized fish which grows up to 5.0 cm (2.0 in).

== Distribution and habitat ==
Chlidichthys pembae is found in the Indian Ocean from Tanzania to South Africa including Ibo Mozambique, the Comoro Islands, and Sodwana Bay, in the Natal of South Africa.
