= William Spinks =

William Spinks may refer to:

- William A. Spinks (1865–1933), American billiard champion, co-inventor of modern billiard chalk, oil investor, farmer, and originator of the Spinks avocado variety
- William H. Spinks (1873–1950), Canadian Conservative Party politician and Manitoba legislator
