= Haskin (surname) =

Haskin is a surname. Notable people with the surname include:

- Byron Haskin (1899–1984), American director
- Dewitt Clinton Haskin (c. 1824 – 1900), American engineer
- Grant Haskin (born 1968), South African politician
- Hudson Haskin (born 1998), American baseball player
- John B. Haskin (1821–1895), American politician
- Joseph A. Haskin (1818–1874), United States Army officer
- Marvin Haskin (1930–2009), American physician and professor
- Scott Haskin (born 1970), American basketball player
- Steve Haskin (born 1947), American journalist and writer
- William L. Haskin (1841–1931), United States Army officer

== See also ==
- Haskins (surname)
- Hoskin, surname
