= Chlidichthys rubiceps =

Conservation status
- Least Concern (IUCN 3.1)

Scientific classification
- Kingdom: Animalia
- Phylum: Chordata
- Class: Actinopterygii
- Order: Blenniiformes
- Family: Pseudochromidae
- Genus: Chlidichthys
- Species: C. rubiceps

Binomial name
- Chlidichthys rubiceps Lubbock, 1975

Species of fish

Chlidichthys rubiceps is a species of fish in the family Pseudochromidae.

== Description ==
Chlidichthys rubiceps is a small-sized fish which grows up to approximately 3.9 cm (1.5 in).

== Distribution and habitat ==
Chlidichthys rubiceps is found in the Red Sea. It is typically found in coral reefs, and in general occupies shallow waters where it stays near crevices or rubble for protection. It feeds on small invertebrates like crustaceans. It is listed as harmless to humans on the IUCN Red List.
