= Chlidichthys cacatuoides =

Conservation status
- Data Deficient (IUCN 3.1)

Scientific classification
- Kingdom: Animalia
- Phylum: Chordata
- Class: Actinopterygii
- Order: Blenniiformes
- Family: Pseudochromidae
- Genus: Chlidichthys
- Species: C. cacatuoides

Binomial name
- Chlidichthys cacatuoides A. C. Gill & Randall, 1994

Species of fish

Chlidichthys cacatuoides, the cockatoo dottyback, is a species of fish in the family Pseudochromidae.

== Description ==
Chlidichthys cacatuoides is a small-sized fish which grows up to 3.7 cm (1.5 in).

== Distribution and habitat ==
Chlidichthys cacatuoides is found in the Indian Ocean from Oman including the Socotra Archipelago.
