= Lubbockichthys tanakai =

Scientific classification
- Domain: Eukaryota
- Kingdom: Animalia
- Phylum: Chordata
- Class: Actinopterygii
- Order: Blenniiformes
- Family: Pseudochromidae
- Genus: Lubbockichthys
- Species: L. tanakai

Binomial name
- Lubbockichthys tanakai A.C.Gill & Senou, 2002

Species of fish

Lubbockichthys tanakai is a species of fish in the family Pseudochromidae.

== Description ==
Lubbockichthys tanakai is a small-sized fish which grows up to 5.3 cm (2.1 in).

== Distribution and habitat ==
Lubbockichthys tanakai is found throughout the Northwest Pacific. From the Ryukyu Islands throughout Japan, into the Philippines and Indonesia.

== Etymology ==
The Dottyback was named in honor of Hiroyuki Tanaka, who provided color slides and a paratype of the species. As an aquarist, he was first to point out this species.
