= Chlidichthys clibanarius =

Conservation status
- Least Concern (IUCN 3.1)

Scientific classification
- Kingdom: Animalia
- Phylum: Chordata
- Class: Actinopterygii
- Order: Blenniiformes
- Family: Pseudochromidae
- Genus: Chlidichthys
- Species: C. clibanarius

Binomial name
- Chlidichthys clibanarius A.C.Gill & Edwards, 2004

Species of fish

Chlidichthys clibanarius, the chainmail dottyback, is a species of fish in the family Pseudochromidae.

== Description ==
Chlidichthys clibanarius is a small-sized fish which grows up to 4.2 cm (1.7 in).

== Distribution and habitat ==
Chlidichthys clibanarius is found only in the Western Indian Ocean from the Comoros, Aldabra in the Seychelles, and in northern Madagascar.
