= Pseudoplesiops =

Scientific classification
- Domain: Eukaryota
- Kingdom: Animalia
- Phylum: Chordata
- Class: Actinopterygii
- Order: Blenniiformes
- Family: Pseudochromidae
- Subfamily: Pseudoplesiopinae
- Genus: Pseudoplesiops; Bleeker, 1858

Type species
- Pseudoplesiops typus Bleeker 1858

Genus of fishes

Pseudoplesiops is a genus of dottyback fishes currently with ten described species. They are distributed in the south Pacific and in the Indian Ocean as far west as the Maldive Islands.

== Species ==
- Pseudoplesiops annae (Weber, 1913) (Anna's dottyback)
- Pseudoplesiops collare A.C. Gill, Randall & Edwards, 1991 (Collared dottyback)
- Pseudoplesiops howensis Allen, 1987 (Lord Howe dottyback)
- Pseudoplesiops immaculatusA.C. Gill & Edwards, 2002 (Immaculate dottyback)
- Pseudoplesiops occidentalis A.C. Gill & Edwards, 2002
- Pseudoplesiops revellei Schultz, 1953 (Bearded Dottyback)
- Pseudoplesiops rosae Schultz, 1943 (Rose Island Basslet)
- Pseudoplesiops typus Bleeker, 1858 (Hidden Basslet)
- Pseudoplesiops wassi A.C. Gill & Edwards, 2003 (Fleckfin Dottyback)
