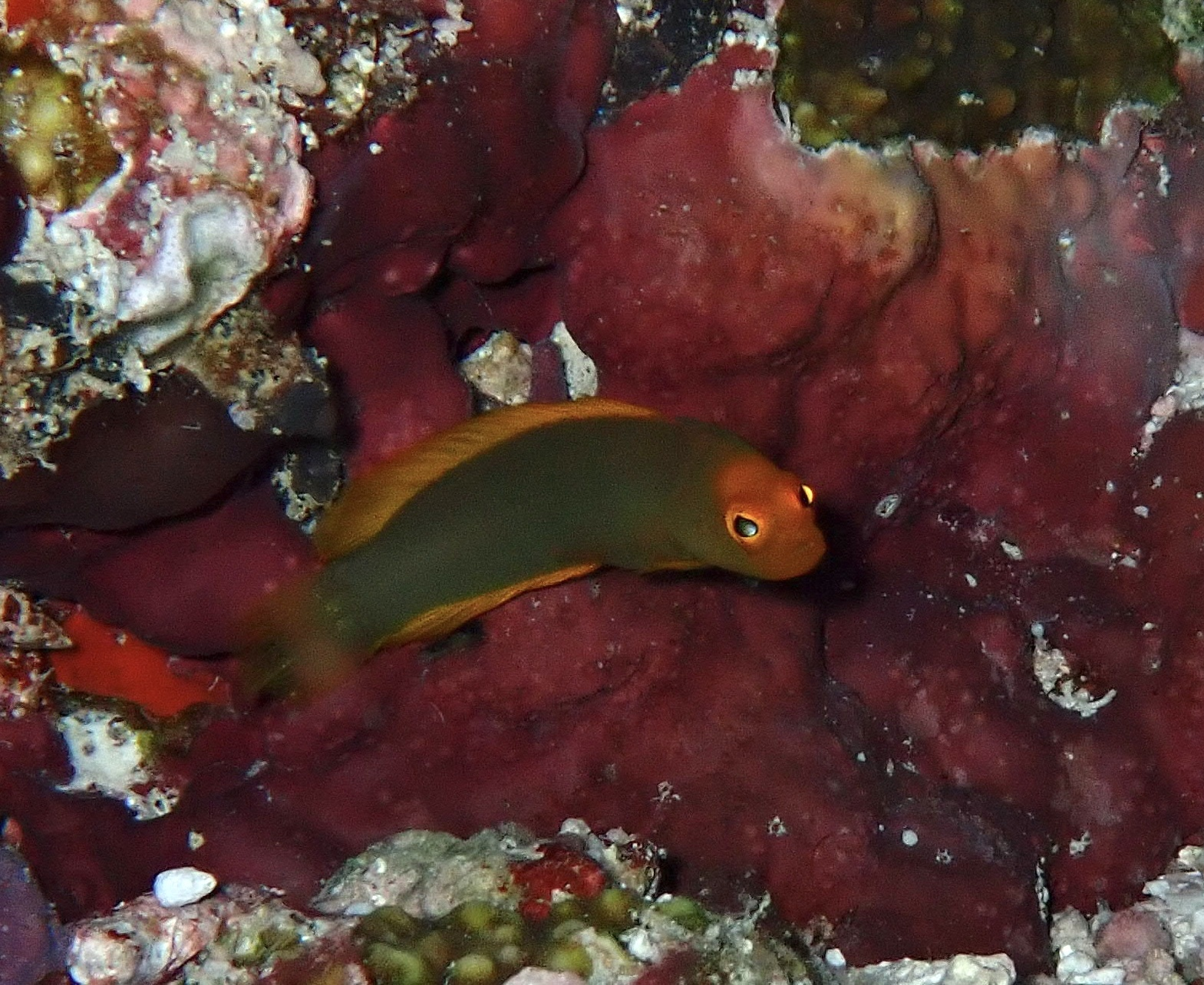

Conservation status
- Least Concern (IUCN 3.1)

Scientific classification
- Kingdom: Animalia
- Phylum: Chordata
- Class: Actinopterygii
- Order: Blenniiformes
- Family: Pseudochromidae
- Genus: Chlidichthys
- Species: C. inornatus

Binomial name
- Chlidichthys inornatus Lubbock, 1976

= Chlidichthys inornatus =

Species of fish

Chlidichthys inornatus is a species of fish in the family Pseudochromidae.

== Description ==
Chlidichthys inornatus is a small sized fish which grows up to 4 cm (1.6 in). Its body has an elongate appearance gently compressed laterally and with prominent eyes. Its body and fins coloration are going from bright yellow to soft grey.

== Distribution & habitat ==
Chlidichthys inornatus is endemic from Sri Lanka, Chagos and Maldives archipelagos in the Indian Ocean.

== Biology ==
Chlidichthys inornatus lives in couple always nearby a shelter on the reef in shallow water. Its diet is carnivorous and composed of small invertebrates and also small fish.
