= Chlidichthys bibulus =

Scientific classification
- Kingdom: Animalia
- Phylum: Chordata
- Class: Actinopterygii
- Order: Blenniiformes
- Family: Pseudochromidae
- Genus: Chlidichthys
- Species: C. bibulus

Binomial name
- Chlidichthys bibulus (J. L. B. Smith, 1954)

Synonyms
- Wamizichthys bibulus Smith, 1954; Pseudoplesiops bibulus (Smith, 1954)

Species of fish

Chlidichthys bibulus, the nosey dottyback, is a species of fish in the family Pseudochromidae.

== Description ==
Chlidichthys bibulus is a small-sized fish which grows up to 6.1 cm (2.4 in).

== Distribution and habitat ==
Chlidichthys bibulus is found in the Indian Ocean from Kenya to Mozambique, to Aldabra Island and including the Socotra Archipelago.
