= Lubbockichthys =

Scientific classification
- Kingdom: Animalia
- Phylum: Chordata
- Class: Actinopterygii
- Order: Blenniiformes
- Family: Pseudochromidae
- Subfamily: Pseudoplesiopinae
- Genus: Lubbockichthys; A. C. Gill & Edwards, 1999

Type species
- Pseudoplesiops multisquamatus Allen, 1987

Genus of fishes

Lubbockichthys is a genus of ray-finned fish from the Indo-Pacific region which belongs to the subfamily Pseudoplesiopinae, part of the family Pseudochromidae, the dottybacks. The species in this genus have small cycloid scales throughout their lives; some of their head bones have a weakly honeycombed surface; and the parietal bone encloses the rear section of the supratemporal laterosensory canal.

The name of this genus honours the Cambridge University ichthyologist, Roger Lubbock (1951-1981) in recognition of his work on the taxonomy of the subfamily Pseudoplesiopinae.

== Species ==
Three species are currently classified in the genus Lubbockichthys:

- Lubbockichthys multisquamatus (G. R. Allen, 1987) (Fine-scaled dottyback)
- Lubbockichthys myersi A.C.Gill & Edwards, 2006
- Lubbockichthys tanakai A.C.Gill & Senou, 2002 (Tanaka's dottyback)
