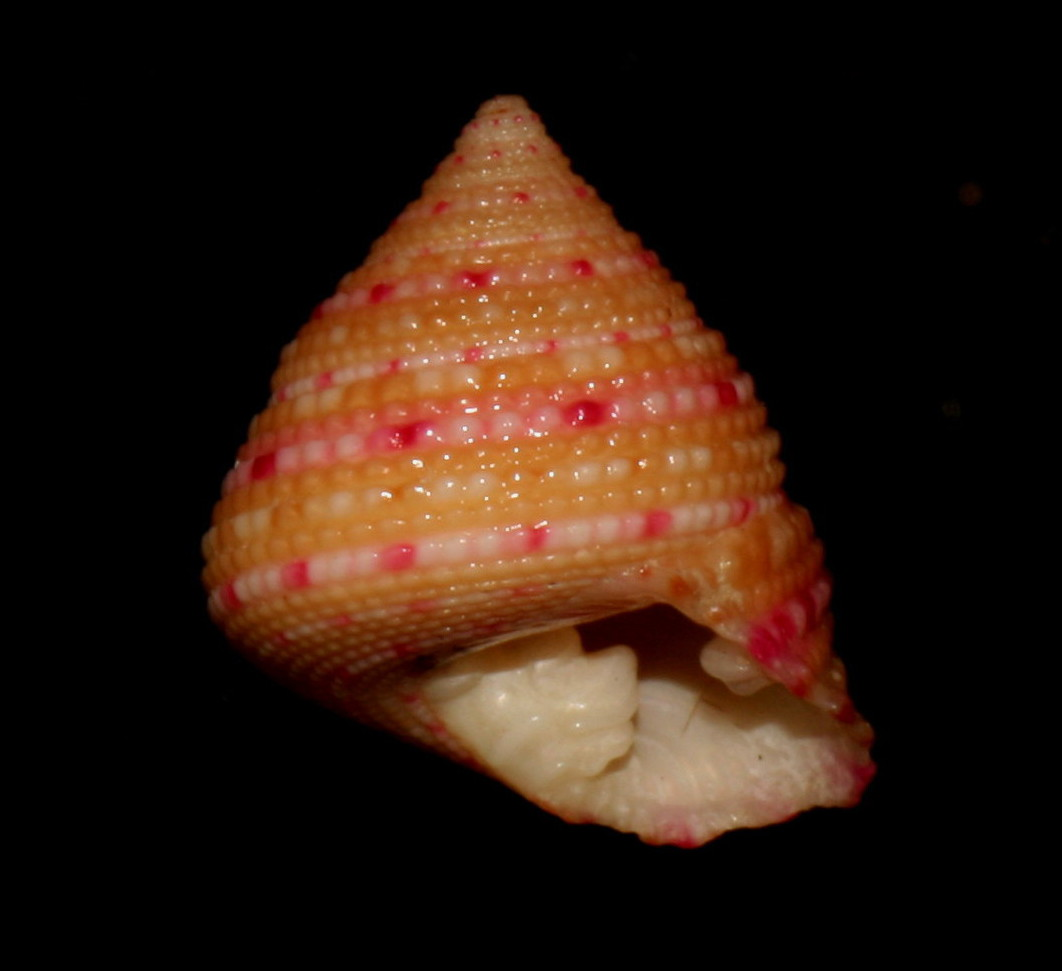
- A shell of Clanculus stigmatarius 12.9 mm high by 10.1 mm diameter, from New Zealand

Scientific classification
- Kingdom: Animalia
- Phylum: Mollusca
- Class: Gastropoda
- Subclass: Vetigastropoda
- Order: Trochida
- Superfamily: Trochoidea
- Family: Trochidae
- Genus: Clanculus
- Species: C. stigmatarius

Binomial name
- Clanculus stigmatarius A. Adams, 1853

= Clanculus stigmatarius =

Species of gastropod

Clanculus stigmatarius is a species of sea snail, a marine gastropod mollusk in the family Trochidae, the top snails.

== Description ==
This species has a widely conical trochid (top-shaped) shell, with a more highly raised spire than is typical for the genus. The shell has spirally ribbed sculpture consisting of conspicuous regular rows of robust, round beads. The whorls show a profile with a deep suture, and the final whorl is slightly inflated. The aperture of the shell is white, oval, with a strongly ridged lip. The umbilicus is deep. The main color of the body of the shell is tan to golden, with a distinctive repeating pattern of rounded beads in colors that include bright pink, red, and ivory white.

== Distribution ==
This species occurs from Port Douglas to Capricorn and Bunker Group, Queensland, Australia in the Indo-Pacific. Alternately, the distribution is listed as: Australia, New Caledonia, Western Pacific, Philippines. A single reference has been found for the species in Okinawa, Japan.
