= Chlidichthys randalli =

Scientific classification
- Kingdom: Animalia
- Phylum: Chordata
- Class: Actinopterygii
- Order: Blenniiformes
- Family: Pseudochromidae
- Genus: Chlidichthys
- Species: C. randalli

Binomial name
- Chlidichthys randalli Lubbock, 1977

Species of fish

Chlidichthys randalli is a species of fish in the family Pseudochromidae.

== Description ==
Chlidichthys randalli is a small-sized fish which grows up to 3.5 cm (1.4 in).

== Distribution and habitat ==
Chlidichthys randalli is found near Mauritius in the Indian Ocean.

== Etymology ==
The fish is named in honor of John E. Randall (1924–2020) of the Bishop Museum in Honolulu, who provided the specimens for this species.
