= Reginald Haskins =

Canadian biologist (1916–1999)

Reginald Hinton Haskins
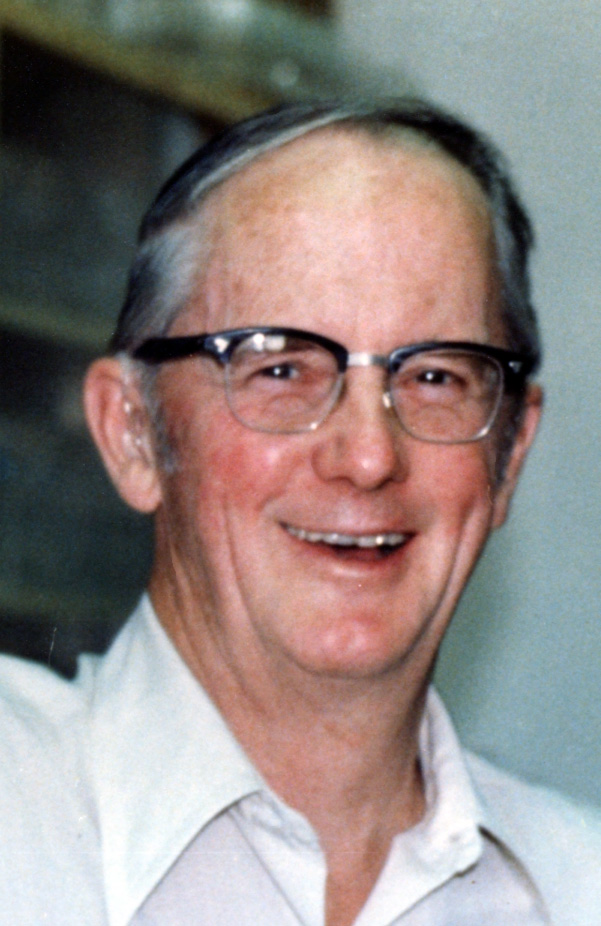
- Haskins in 1978
- Born: July 16, 1916; North Bay, Ontario, Canada
- Died: March 17, 1999 (aged 82); Saskatoon, Saskatchewan, Canada
- Education: Harvard University
- Known for: Physiology, ultrastructure and taxonomy of Fungi.
- Scientific career
- Fields: Mycology
- Workplaces: National Research Council (Canada), Saskatoon
- Thesis: Studies in the lower Chytridiales (1948)
- Doctoral advisor: William H. Weston Jr.
- Author abbrev. (botany): Haskins

Reginald H. Haskins (July 16, 1916 - March 17, 1999) was a Canadian mycologist. Born in North Bay, Ontario, Haskins trained as a botanist, specializing in mycology, receiving his master's degree from the University of Western Ontario and his doctorate degree from Harvard University in 1949. He lived with his wife and three children in Saskatoon, Canada.

== Scientific career ==
Haskins was appointed in 1948 as one of the first research scientists at the Prairie Regional Laboratory (now the Plant Biotechnology Institute) of the National Research Council Canada, Saskatoon, and was a Section Head in the institute starting in 1950. In 1952, he started a fungal culture collection (with the official acronym PRL), mostly of industrially relevant fungi, which eventually included > 1200 strains. These cultures were eventually transferred to the Canadian Collection of Fungal Cultures, with Agriculture and Agri-Food Canada in Ottawa.

== Research in mycology ==
Haskins discovered a new genus and new species of yeast-like fungi that he named Trichosporonoides oedocephalis, which was isolated from brood cells of honey bees. The morphology and biochemistry of the fungus were remarkable. Cultures had four different kinds of asexual sporulation and produced large quantities of erythritol. Other mycologists found additional species associated with different kinds of bees, or from low water activity substrates. Several of them also produced polyols and culturing parameters were optimized and the strains mutated to maximize production, resulting in several patents. Recently,Trichosporonoides was synonymized with Moniliella.

Haskins also studied antibiotic and pigment metabolites produced in a 23-litre liquid fermenter by corn smut (Ustilago maydis) and the ergot fungus (Claviceps purpurea).

Haskins represented Canada on the council of the Mycological Society of America from 1965 to 1967.

== Athletic activities ==
Prior to moving to Saskatoon, Haskins was the head coach of the University of Western Ontario fencing team from 1939 to 1946, with a two-year break for military service between 1941 and 1942 as part of the Algonquin Regiment of the Canadian Armed Forces. In Saskatoon, Haskins coached the University of Saskatchewan men's and women's fencing teams for 25 years, and was honored as the university's Coach of the Year in 1970.
