= George Hoskins =

George Hoskins may refer to:

- George Hoskins (Australian footballer) (1916–1995), Australian rules footballer with Fitzroy
- George Gilbert Hoskins (1824–1893), Lieutenant Governor of New York, 1880–1883
- George Gordon Hoskins (1837–1911), English architect
- George W. Hoskins (1864–1958), American football and basketball coach
- George Hoskins (athlete) (1928–2000), New Zealand middle-distance athlete

== See also ==
- George Hosking (born 1944), founder of the WAVE Trust
