= Roy Hoskins =

Australian rugby union player (c.1900–??)

- Born: A. E. Roy Hoskins c. 1900 Sydney

Rugby union career
- Position: number eight
International career
Years	Team	Apps	(Points)
1924	Wallabies	3	(0)

A. E. Roy Hoskins (born c. 1900) was a rugby union player who represented Australia.

Hoskins, a number eight, was born in Sydney and claimed a total of 3 international rugby caps for Australia.
