= Charles Haskins =

Charles Haskins may refer to:

- Charles Homer Haskins (1870–1937), American historian and advisor to U.S. President Woodrow Wilson
- Charles Waldo Haskins (1852–1903), American accountant
