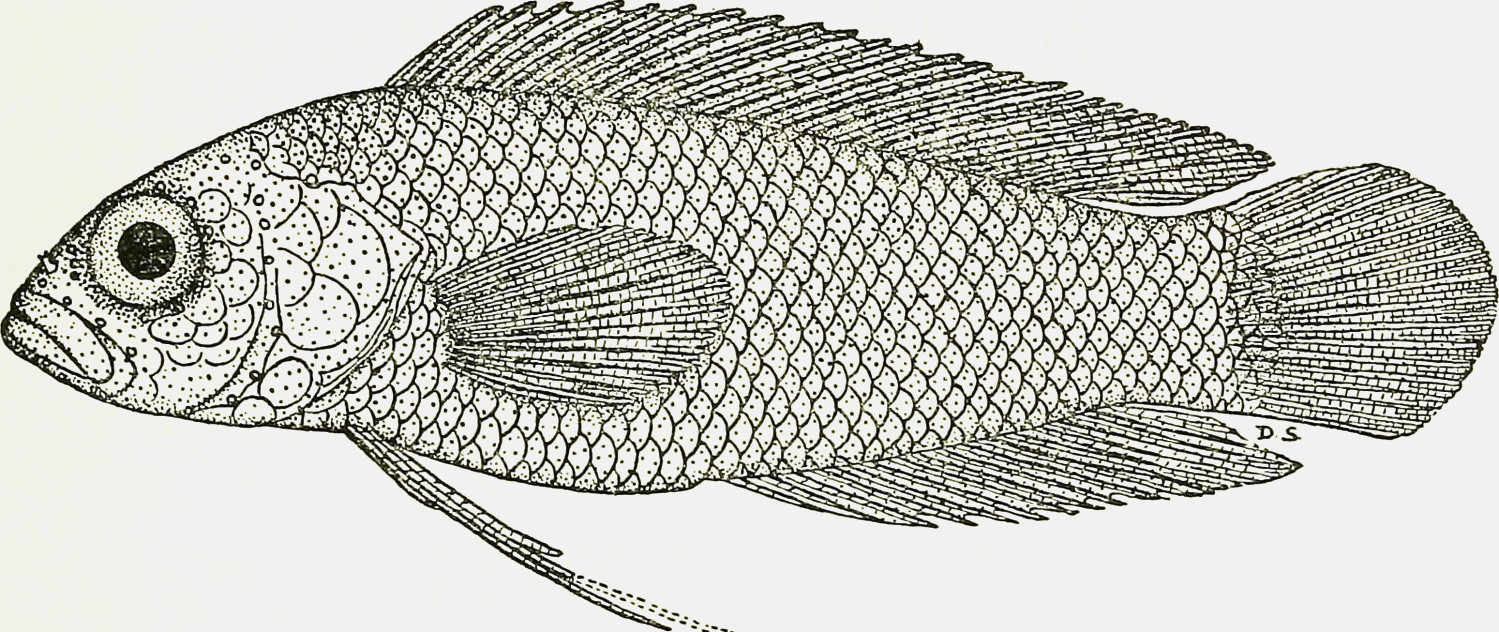
- Pseudoplesiops typus

Scientific classification
- Kingdom: Animalia
- Phylum: Chordata
- Class: Actinopterygii
- Order: Blenniiformes
- Family: Pseudochromidae
- Subfamily: Pseudoplesiopinae; Bleeker, 1875

= Pseudoplesiopinae =

Subfamily of fishes

Pseudoplesiopinae is a subfamily of the family Pseudochromidae, the dottybacks. It consists of small species of coral-reef inhabiting fish which are distributed throughout the Indo-Pacific.

== Characteristics ==
Workers have established that this subfamily is monophyletic. They have a pelvic fin which has a single spine and three or four unbranched soft rays. Their heads are covered in scales. Most of the rays in their dorsal fins are simple. They have teeth on the palatine bone. Their pectoral fins have 17–19 rays, and the lateral line has one anterior-pored scale.

== Genera ==
The following genera are included in the subfamily Pseudoplesiopinae:

- Amsichthys A. C. Gill & A.J. Edwards, 1999
- Chlidichthys J. L. B. Smith, 1953
- Lubbockichthys A. C. Gill & A.J. Edwards, 1999
- Pectinochromis A. C. Gill & A.J. Edwards, 1999
- Pseudoplesiops Bleeker, 1858
