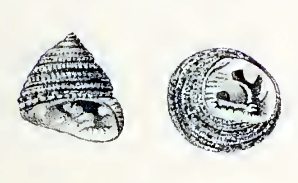
- Drawing showing two views of a shell of Clanculus clanguloides

Scientific classification
- Kingdom: Animalia
- Phylum: Mollusca
- Class: Gastropoda
- Subclass: Vetigastropoda
- Order: Trochida
- Superfamily: Trochoidea
- Family: Trochidae
- Genus: Clanculus
- Species: C. clanguloides

Binomial name
- Clanculus clanguloides (Wood, 1828)

Synonyms
- Trochus clanguloides Wood, 1828

= Clanculus clanguloides =

Species of gastropod

Clanculus clanguloides, common name the secret clanculus, is a species of sea snail, a marine gastropod mollusk in the family Trochidae, the top snails.

== Description ==
The height of the shell varies between 10 mm and 12 mm, its diameter between 12 mm and 15 mm. The very solid, deeply, narrowly false-umbilicate shell has a globose-conic shape. It is fawn colored, lighter beneath and roseate at the apex. The shell is sharply granose-lirate, usually with every second rib articulated with dots of white or black or both. It contains about 6 whorls. The upper ones are nearly fiat, the penultimate and last convex, the former with 7 or 8 spiral distinctly granose lirae, the last with about 18, of which the 7th usually is upon the periphery. The interstices are finely obliquely striate. The body whorl is deflected anteriorly, and rounded at the periphery. The base of the shell is somewhat convex. The oblique aperture is small and contracted. The outer lip bears within a strong tooth above, and an inconspicuous rather acute thread at the place of the periphery. The basal lip is expanded, curved and slightly denticulate. The columella is very oblique, slightly tortuous above and enters very deeply, terminating below in a strong plicate tooth, and with a smooth margin, save for a small denticle immediately above the basal tooth. The parietal tract is wrinkled. The umbilicus has a plicate-denticulate border.

In the typical form, the 1st, 3rd, 5th, 7th, and 9th lirae, and one or two upon the base are articulated with black.

== Distribution ==
This marine species occurs in the Central and East Indian Ocean; off East Africa, East India, Indo-China, Indo-Malaysia, and Oceania; in the tropical Indo-West Pacific and off Queensland, Australia.
