= Sarah Haskins =

Sarah Haskins may refer to:

- Sarah Haskins (triathlete) (born 1981), American triathlete
- Sarah Haskins (comedian) (born 1979), American InfoMania comedian
