= Hoskyn Islands =

Islands in Queensland, Australia

- Location within Queensland
- Location: Queensland
- Nearest city: Gladstone
- Coordinates: 23°48′20″S 152°17′45″E
- Area: 1.65 ha (4.1 acres)
- Governing body: Queensland Parks and Wildlife Service
- Website: Official website

Hoskyn Islands is a pair of small coral cays. They are located near the Tropic of Capricorn in the southern Great Barrier Reef, 107 km due east of Gladstone, Queensland, Australia, and 412 km north of the state capital Brisbane.

The island is the fourth island in the Great Barrier Reef chain of islands (with the first being Lady Elliot Island), and is part of the Capricorn and Bunker Group of islands, forming part of the Capricornia Cays National Park as well as part of the Capricornia Cays Important Bird Area. Most people only see the island by the more easily reached Lady Musgrave Island, which can be readily reached by fast catamaran from the town of 1770, Queensland, or from Gladstone, both of which are located approximately five hours' drive north of Brisbane.

The pair of Hoskyn cays are

- East Hoskyn 23°48′26″S 152°17′27″E
- West Hoskyn 23°48′06″S 152°18′00″E

== Geomorphology and landscape ==
The eastern cay is composed of shingle and supports vegetation similar to, although less well-developed than, that of Lady Musgrave Island. The western cay is composed of sand and its vegetation is similar to that of the larger sand cays Capricorn Group.

Both cays have increased in size since 1936.

The Capricorn and Bunker Cays form part of a distinct geomorphic province at the southern end of the Great Barrier Reef. The cays and their reefs lie on the western marginal shelf, and are separated from the mainland by the Curtis Channel. The cays are not generally visible from the mainland, although Masthead Island may be viewed from Mount Larcom on a clear day.

Geologically the cays are young, having developed during the Holocene period, they are mostly around 5000 years old. The sea level was much lower during the last Ice Age (at the end of the Pleistocene period) and the coastal plain on which today's reefs and cays developed was completely exposed. Early in the Holocene (around 10,000 years ago) the sea level began to rise, until it stabilised at its present level around 6000 years ago. Once the sea level stabilised, it was possible for reef flats to expand and provide potential sites for the formation of cays.

Hoskyn Reefs is a Closed Ring Reef.

The cays occur on planar reefs of various sizes and with various levels of exposure to the prevailing winds. These factors have largely determined cay size and composition, which consists either of shingle, sand, or a mixture of both. Cay stability is profoundly affected by cyclonic disturbance.

The coral cays belong to two distinct types:

1. Vegetated sand cays: Hoskyn (West).
2. Shingle cays: Hoskyn (East).

The sand cay is located to the lee of their reef flat, whereas the shingle cay is located on the windward side.

== History ==
=== Discovery ===
In 1803 Captain Eber Bunker of the whaling ship Albion was the first European to discover the region and gave his name to the southern group.

The southern cays and reefs were first chartered between 1819 and 1821 by Lieutenant Phillip Parker King of the Royal Navy initially in Mermaid and later in Bathurst. The main charting exercise for all the islands and reefs was carried out in 1843 under the command of Captain Francis Blackwood in HMS Fly which was accompanied by HMS Bramble. The naturalist, Professor J. Beete Jukes, was on board Fly and his published journal provides valuable information on some of the cays.

=== Mining of guano 1930s ===
The mining of guano (bird droppings) had occurred earlier during the 1890s on Lady Musgrave Island, Fairfax and North West Island . This was an extension of a more substantial guano mining operation on Lady Elliot Island to the south.

Yet later during September 1933 the leases and guano rights of Fairfax and Hoskyn Islands, off Gladstone, were sold by auction at Gladstone. They were bought on behalf of the Barrier Reef Phosphate (Guano) Syndicate.

It is unsure if the project ever succeeded in the removal of guano from Hoskyn Islands, but as can be seen from the below newspaper article the company intended to remove a significant quantity of the accumulated droppings of innumerable birds for use as a fertiliser:

The Barrier Reef Phosphate (Guano) Syndicate interests on the north-east coast of Queensland have been taken over by Phosphates Pty, Ltd, a private company formed with a capital of £10,000 to work guano deposits and exploit other products The Bunker Group includes Lady Musgrave, Fairfax, and Hoskyn Islands, as they run m that order north of Lady Elliott Island The new company has secured leases of Fairfax and Hoskin, and the right to remove guano there from.

From the report of the company's surveyor it appears that there are 20000 tons of guano available for immediate exploitation, and samples analysed by Mr John D. Spence, PCS, are said to show the component parts of nitrogen and phosphoric acid to make it of commercial value as a phosphate fertiliser which could be used as a base in the manufacture of complete compound fertilisers.

In addition to the guano commercial use of the coral obtainable from the islands may be mace by conversion into lime, a branch of industry now followed farther north, whence lime for the sugar industry is drawn in large quantities. The company proposes, with a formula which has been proved satisfactory, to prepare turtle soup, turtle extract and calipee and calapash for the overseas market. Fish and other Great Barrier products will also be dealt in by the company.

=== Discovery of a missing launch – 1948 ===
A missing 35-foot launch was found badly battered at Hoskyn Island although the two men who had been aboard the launch were never found even after an exhaustive search of the surrounding islands by a Royal Australian Air Force Lincoln flying over the area in case the men managed to get ashore.

== Ecology ==
=== Natural ===
Green turtle rookeries are located at Wreck Island, West Hoskyn and West Fairfax Islands; these are maintained in a natural condition, free from human disturbance. The Capricorn silvereye, a small bird endemic to the southern Great Barrier Reef, is found on the island. There are also brown booby breeding colonies at East and West Fairfax and East Hoskyn Islands. Vegetation in the Hoskyn Islands includes genus Pisonia, Ficus and Pandanus members.

== See also ==
- Capricorn and Bunker Group
- Capricornia Cays National Park
- Great Barrier Reef
