= Eastminster (ship) =

Coordinates: 23.447°S 151.918°E

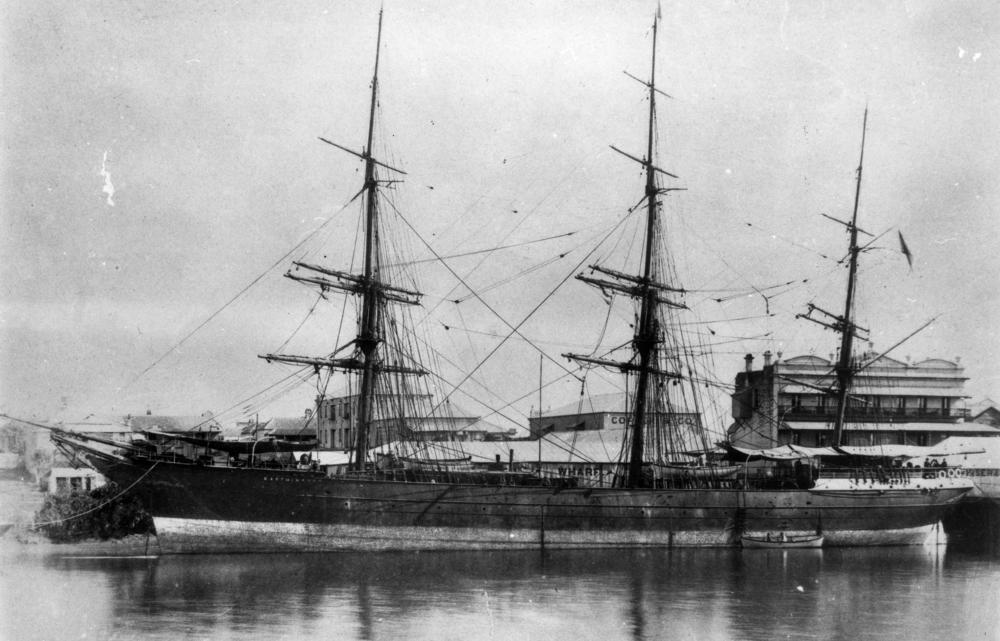
- Eastminster

History

United Kingdom
- Name: Eastminster
- Owner: E.W. Berryman
- Builder: Built in Port Glasgow, Scotland
- Launched: June 1876
- Fate: Lost February 1888

General characteristics
- Class & type: Full-rigged iron-hulled ship
- Tons burthen: 1145 tons; 1208 tons
- Length: 226 ft (69 m)
- Beam: 35 ft 3 in (10.74 m)
- Draught: 20 ft 5 in (6.22 m)

Eastminster was an iron full-rigged ship built in Port Glasgow, Scotland, in 1876. She operated as an emigrant vessel.

Eastminster was last seen departing Maryborough, Queensland, Australia, after ignoring a warning from the harbor pilot, heading out to sea in a rising gale on 17 February 1888, bound for Newcastle, New South Wales, Australia. Eastminster was presumed lost during a tropical cyclone that passed through the area immediately afterward. Her wreckage was reported on a coral reef in the Capricorn and Bunker Group in the Coral Sea approximately 100 nautical miles (190 km) east of Rockhampton, Queensland.
