= Huskinson =

Huskinson is a surname. Notable people with the surname include:

- Geoffrey Huskinson (cricketer) (1900–1982), English cricketer
- Geoffrey Huskinson (cartoonist) (1935–2018), English cartoonist and cricketer
- Henry Huskinson (1890–1963), British gymnast
- Patrick Huskinson (1897–1966), British Royal Air Force officer
