= Hoskin =

Hoskin is a surname. Notable people with the name include:

- Ashley Hoskin (born 1968), English footballer
- Chuck Hoskin Jr. (born 1974/1975), tribal nation chief
- Chuck Hoskin (born 1952), politician and father of Chuck Hoskin Jr.
- Cyril Henry Hoskin (1910–1981), pen name Lobsang Rampa, author of The Third Eye
- David Hoskin (born 1935), New Zealand cricketer and administrator
- John Hoskin (1921-1990), British sculptor
- Richard Hoskin (born 1959), New Zealand cricketer and administrator
- Sheila Hoskin (born 1936), English track and field athlete
- Trevor Hoskin (born 2004), Canadian Ice Hockey Player

== See also ==
- Haskin (surname)
- Hoskins, surname
