= William Lawrence Hoskins =

American politician

William Lawrence Hoskins (24 December 1828 – 8 March 1901) was a Democratic member of the Wisconsin State Assembly. He was elected in 1870 and 1871. Hoskins was born in North East, Pennsylvania and is buried at the Rock Lake Cemetery in Lake Mills, Wisconsin.
