= William Hoskins (inventor) =

American inventor, chemist, electrical engineer, and entrepreneur

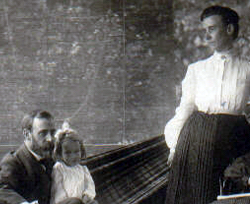
- William Hoskins, with daughter Florence and wife Ada, c. 1885–1890
- Born: 1862
- Died: 1934 (aged 72)
- Occupation: Inventor
- Notable work: Billiard chalk, electric heating coil

William Hoskins (1862–1934) was an American inventor, chemist, electrical engineer, and entrepreneur in the late 19th and early 20th centuries, most active in Chicago, Illinois. He became the co-inventor in 1897 of modern billiard chalk with professional carom billiards player William A. Spinks. He is, however, best known for the invention of the electric heating coil (the basis for numerous ubiquitous household and industrial appliances, including electric stoves, space heaters, and toasters) and the invention of the first electric toaster.

== Career ==
=== Early life ===
William Hoskins was born in 1862 to parents John and Mary Ann Hoskins, in Chicago. Hoskins would complete just two of three years of Chicago High School. Despite having an interest in chemistry, he would gain no formal education in chemistry throughout his early years. Hoskins, however, received "private instruction" in the field, before joining (at age thirteen), the Illinois State Microscopical Society. Four years later, at 17, the society elected him secretary.

After leaving high school in 1880 at age 17, Hoskins prepared chemical analysis samples for Chicago-based consulting and analytical chemist George A. Mariner in the latter's commercial laboratory, starting in February. Beginning in 1880, Mariner was one of only three completely commercial chemists in Chicago. Five years after joining the laboratory, Hoskins became Mariner's partner; the firm was renamed Mariner and Hoskins. Shortly before becoming the partner, Hoskins married Mariner's daughter, Ada Mae, (Note: Both Mae and May have been used) on December 18, 1883. In 1890, Hoskins became sole proprietor of the laboratory. The couple subsequently had four children: Minna, Edward, William, and Florence.

=== Later career ===
In 1897, Hoskins began working with William A. Spinks before becoming a partner in William A. Spinks & Co. In the early 1900s, Hoskins would also become the director of Hoskins Manufacturing Co., based in Detroit, creating electric heating appliances and pyrometers. He was made a fellow of the American Association for the Advancement of Science (AAAS), and was also a charter member of the Chicago section of the American Chemical Society (ACS), of which he was the chairman in 1897, later becoming the national ACS's vice-president,. Hoskins Manufacturing eventually become Hoskins Process Development Co., of which he was the president. Hoskins became a recognized scientific expert witness in lawsuits, took out 37 US patents, and in Hoskins's lab, Albert L. Marsh developed nichrome under supervision of Hoskins. Hoskins's own innovations include superior chalk for billiards, several materials used in construction of race tracks, paper used for bank checks, a method for destroying weeds, and a gasoline blowtorch.

== Inventions ==
=== Electric heating coil ===
William Hoskins is credited with invention of the electric heating coil. In the early 1900s, having worked on a form of nichrome known as chromel, working with Marsh over the alloy, he deduced that it could be used as a heating element. The heating coil was created using nichrome, and was later used in early versions of the toaster and the electric kettle. The heating coil was one of the first projects for Hoskins Manufacturing Co.; Hoskins had considered manufacturing toasters, but later abandoned those plans, and focused on the coil itself.

=== Billiard chalk ===
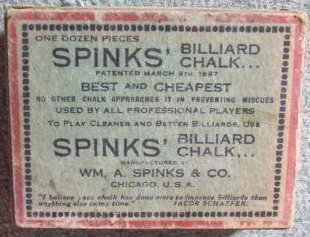
Label of a box of a dozen cubes of William A. Spinks Company billiard chalk, c. 1900–1910. Note the endorsement by champion Jacob Schaefer Sr.

In the late 19th century, actual chalk (generally calcium carbonate, also known as calcite or carbonate of lime) was often used in cue sports on the leather tips of cue sticks to better grip the cue ball, but players experimented with other powdery, abrasive substances, since chalk itself was too abrasive, and over time damaged the game equipment. In 1892, the aforementioned straight rail billiards pro William Spinks was particularly impressed by a piece of natural chalk-like substance obtained in France, and presented it to Hoskins for analysis. Hoskins, having encountered such material before, was able to determine that it was volcanic ash (pumice), probably from Mount Etna, Sicily. The two of them experimented with different formulations to achieve the cue ball "action" that Spinks sought.

They settled on a mixture of Illinois-sourced silica with small amounts of corundum or aloxite (aluminum oxide, AL_{2}O_{3}), founding the William A. Spinks Company in Chicago after securing a patent on March 9, 1897. Spinks later left the company, but it retained his name and was subsequently run by Hoskins, and later by Hoskins's cousin Edmund F. Hoskin, after Hoskins moved on to other projects.

The William A. Spinks Company product (still emulated by modern manufacturers with slightly different, proprietary silicate compounds) effectively revolutionized billiards, by providing a cue tip friction enhancer that allowed the tip to grip the cue ball briefly and impart a previously unattainable amount of "english" (spin), which consequently allowed more precise and more extreme cue ball control, made miscuing less likely, made swerve and massé (curve, or even reversing) shots plausible, and eventually spawned the cue sport of artistic billiards almost a century later. Even the basic draw and follow shots of modern billiards games depend heavily on the effects and properties of modern billiard "chalk".
