= Capricorn and Bunker Group =

Islands in Queensland, Australia

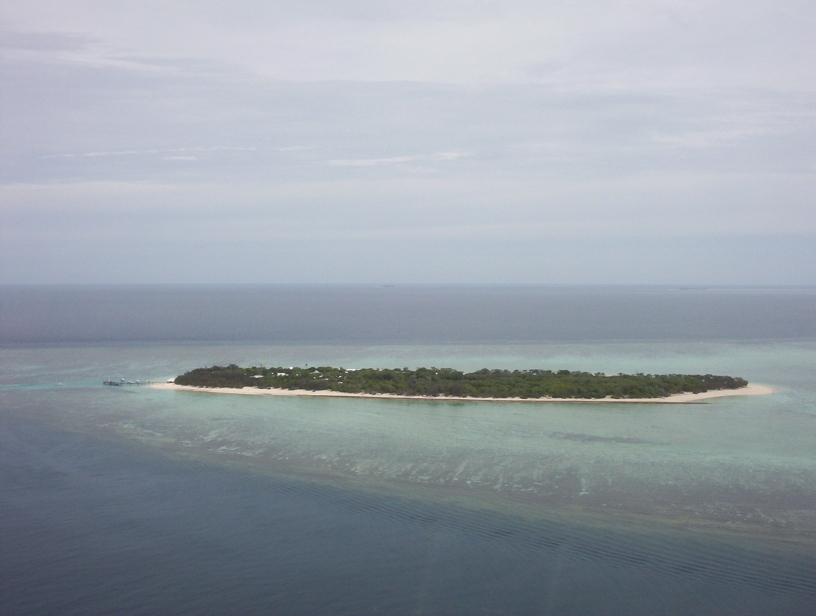
- Heron Island from helicopter, looking north-northeast.

- Coordinates: 23.37944°S 151.81861°E
- Country: Australia
- State: Queensland

Area
  - Total: 3.435 km^{2} (1.326 sq mi)

The islands and reefs of the Capricorn and Bunker Group are situated astride the Tropic of Capricorn at the southern end of the Great Barrier Reef, approximately 80 kilometres east of Gladstone, which is situated on the central coast of the Gladstone Region, Queensland, Australia.

Many of these islands form part of the Capricornia Cays National Park and are part of the Great Barrier Reef World Heritage Area.

== Geography ==
The Capricorn and Bunker group of islands of the southern Great Barrier Reef lies between 45 and 75 km (28 and 47 mi) from the adjacent departure ports and urban centres of Yeppoon, Gladstone, Town of 1770 and Bundaberg.

The Capricorn and Bunker groups (including Lady Elliot Island and Reef) are a distinct group of 22 reefs straddling the Tropic of Capricorn, at the southern end of the Great Barrier Reef. There are 16 permanent coral cays on these reefs, including twin cays on Hoskyn and Fairfax Reefs. North West Island (105 hectares, 260 acres) is the largest coral cay in the Great Barrier Reef Marine Park.

The islands have high natural values, notably breeding populations of seabirds, marine turtles and coral cay vegetation.

=== Capricorn Group ===
North West Island shoreline

Masthead Island shoreline

The Capricorn Group of islands consists of nine coral cays:

- North Reef Island
- Tryon Island
- North West Island
- Wilson Island
- Wreck Island
- Masthead Island
- Erskine Island
- Heron Island
- One Tree Island

Additional to these are several reef structures separate from the individual island but still part of the Capricorn Group of islands including

- Sykes Reef 23°25′59″S 152°01′57″E
- Wistari Reef 23°28′19″S 151°52′55″E
- Polmaise Reef 23°33′12″S 151°40′58″E
- Fitzroy Lagoon Reef 23°36′49″S 152°09′34″E
- Llewellyn Reef 23°41′32″S 152°11′01″E
- Lamont Reef 23°36′00″S 152°02′56″E
- Broomfield Reef 23°16′02″S 151°26′29.8″E (possibly with a sandbank or an unvegetated cay)

A tourist Resort and Marine Scientific Research Station have been established on Heron Island. A manned lighthouse operates at North Island and the University of Sydney operates a field research station on One Tree Island.

=== Bunker Group ===
The Bunker Group consists of five coral cays:

- Lady Musgrave Island
- Fairfax Islands, (East Fairfax & West Fairfax)
- Hoskyn Islands (East and West Hoskyn islands)

In association with

- Boult Reef 23°45′32″S 152°16′22″E

== History ==
=== European pre-discovery of the Group (close sailbys) ===
During Captain James Cook's first voyage of discovery he sailed well inside the island group between 21 and 25 May 1770, typically two to five miles (3.2 to 8.0 km) offshore. He then made his second landing in Australia at the town of 1770.

Wednesday 23rd Continued our Course a long shore at the distance of about 2 Miles off having from 12 to 9, 8 and 7 fathom water until 5 oClock at which time we were abreast of the South point of a large open bay where in I intended to anchor. accordingly we hauld in close upon a wind and sent a boat a head to sound. after making some trips we anchor'd at 8 oClock in 5 fathom water a Sandy bottom the South point of the Bay bore E3/4 South distance 2 Miles and the north point NW1/4 N and about 2 Miles from the ^shore in the bottom of the bay...........

In the AM I went a shore with a party of men in order to examine the Country accompanied by Mr Banks and the other gentlemen. we landed alittle within the South point of the Bay where there is a channel leading into a large Lagoon

During Matthew Flinders' exploration of the Australian coastline in Investigator, a 334-ton sloop, to make a survey along the southern coast of the Australian mainland he passed inshore of the island group.

WEDNESDAY 4 AUGUST 1802, the wind had shifted gradually round, from north to the south-westward; and at noon the north head of Bustard, Bay was brought to bear S. 16° E., four leagues, our latitude being then 23° 48', and longitude 151° 40'. A low island was seen from the mast head, bearing north at the supposed distance of six leagues, of which captain Cook does not make any mention;* and the furthest visible part of the main land was a conspicuous hill, named Mount Larcom, in compliment to captain Larcom of the navy. It bore W. ½° N., ten or eleven leagues; but the coast line between it and the north head of Bustard Bay, seemed to be much broken.

[* A cluster of low islands, about fifteen leagues from the coast, was seen in the following year by Mr. Bunker, commander of the Albion, south whaler. He described the cluster to be of considerable extent, and as lying in latitude 23¾°, and longitude about 152½°; or nearly a degree to the eastward of the low isle above mentioned. It is probably to these islands, whose existence captain Cook suspected, that the great flights of boobies he saw in Hervey's Bay retire at night.]

=== Discovery of the Bunker Group ===
In 1803 Captain Eber Bunker of the whaling ship Albion was the first European to discover the region and gave his name to the southern group.

The Mitchell Library holds a portrait of Eber Bunker wearing a white waistcoat and white linen ruffled shirt each with stand collars, a white stock at neckline, and a navy blue wool double-breasted jacket with brass buttons titled Captain Eber Bunker, 1760–1836, The first of the Whalers, Arrived New South Wales 1791.

=== Charting of the Groups ===
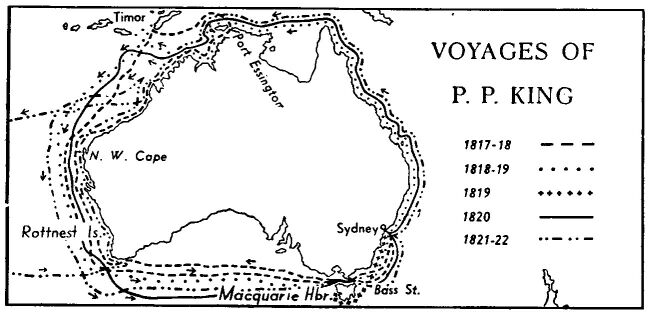
Voyages of King

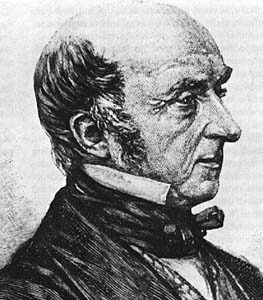
Phillip Parker King

The southern cays and reefs were first chartered between 1819 and 1821 by Lieutenant Phillip Parker King Royal Navy initially in Mermaid and later in Bathurst.

July 19, 1820 we steered on, and, a ten o’clock discovered a group of low woody islets. They were named Bunker Isles

The main charting exercise for all the islands and reefs was carried out in 1843 under the command of Captain Francis Price Blackwood in HMS Fly which was accompanied by Bramble.

In 1841 Blackwood was appointed to command the corvette HMS Flyin the first hydrographic survey commissioned by the Admiralty for exploring and charting the north-east Australian coast. Fly, fitted with costly instruments, and carrying two scientists, Joseph Jukes, geologist, and John MacGillivray, zoologist, sailed from Falmouth in April 1842 with the cutter Bramble, under the charge of Lieutenant Charles Yule. After a stop in Hobart Town from August to October, the two ships called at Sydney and began the survey in December 1842.

In the next three years Fly charted from Sandy Cape to Whitsunday Island, including Swain Reefs and Capricorn Islands and the broad passages between. On 7 January 1843, was the first time that the crew of Fly set foot on the First Bunker Island (Lady Elliot Island). Fly then carried on and on 10 January 1843, anchored off One Tree Island and gave the island its name. The crew of Fly landed on this island the following day

The single tree (which was in fact a small clump of common pandanus of these seas, with its roots exposed above ground).......

On January the 12th We anchored a few miles farther to the N.W. in the centre of a group of reefs and islands, under one thickly wooded island that afterwoods obtained the name if Heron Island......

Jan 13 to 18 - The Fly, the Bramble and the boats were engaged in surveying the group of islands and reefs about, which, from the tropic of Capricorn running through them, have been called the Capricorn Group......

Jan 18 - Landed with Captain Blackwood on Wreck Island. This was so named for part of a vessel 6 or 700 tons. The island was about a quarter of a mile long and not more than 100 yards broad; a pile of sand covered by thick bushes.

Jan 21 Captain Blackwood and Mr Evans being ashore to "take sights" for the chronometers, found on the island some traces of the wrecked crew. On one tree was cut "The America, June 1831;" on another "Mary Ann Broughton;" on another "Capt. E. David;" and "Nelson November, 1831." There were likewise the soles of a pair of child’s shoes, some bottles, some broken dishes, and an old cask. I believe the wreck was that of a whaler, and that the crew were taken off by another whaler, as there were no signs of either graves or bones.

The naturalist, Professor J. Beete Jukes, was on board HMS Fly and his published journal provides valuable information on some of the cays.

=== Early uses – guano mining 1890s ===
The mining of guano (bird droppings) was carried out by J. T. Arundel & Co, a company controlled by John T. Arundel that evolved into the Pacific Islands Company. Mining occurred on Lady Musgrave Island, Fairfax Islands and North West Island during the 1890s. This was an extension of a more substantial guano mining operation on Lady Elliot Island to the south and several of the south Coral Sea Islands particularly Bird Islet part of Wreck Reefs and Raine Island, where profound impacts on vegetation were sustained as a result of the industry. Some remains of these activities are still evident.

A good description of part of the operations from 1899 can be found below

The Pacific Islands Company, having worked cut the guano deposits at Fairfax Island, Bunker Group, is now transferring their plant to North-west Island in the Capricorn Group, which will be "the head- quarters for some time to" come (says the "Bundaberg Star" of yesterday). The steamer Lady Musgrave, which was chartered by the company for this work, returned to Bundaberg on Sunday afternoon, bringing Mr. A. E. Ellis, the local manager, and account forty Japanese, whose services are being dispensed with. The captain of the Lady Musgrave reports that he had helped to complete the work of removal from Fairfax to North-east Island. In about ten days, but, owing to the bad weather experienced, it occupied sixteen days to get through with It. So bad was the weather, that in fourteen days the vessel was only able to Steam for fifty hours, the steamer having to take shelter behind one of the islands from the heavy squalls and rain. The Lady Musgrave left Fairfax Island at 4 p.m. on Saturday, with the ketch Loma Doone in tow. Heavy weather was encountered, and at 3 p.m. on Sunday the line parted, and not withstanding all the efforts made, it proved impossible to pick up the ketch again, and it was decided to make for Burnett Heads, which were not reached, as stated, till 4 p.m. the same day. The Loma Doone apparently got through all right, for she was reported off Bustard Head on Sunday, and is expected to arrive here tomorrow

Yet latter during September 1933 the leases and guano rights of Fairfax and Hoskyn Islands, off Gladstone, were sold by auction at Gladstone. They were bought on behalf of the Barrier Reef Phosphate (Guano) Syndicate.

It is unsure if the project ever succeed in the removal of guano from Hoskyn Islands.

=== Early uses – turtle soup canneries ===
Turtle soup canneries operated on North West Island from 1904 to 1914 and 1924 to 1926, and on Heron Island from 1925 to 1929. Old boilers and other remnants from these activities remain on site.

=== Tourist resorts 1930s ===
A concrete slab is the only remnant of a resort which operated at Lady Musgrave Island during the 1930s. The island had been a hub for a number of pleasure cruises when eventually more extensive construction of tourist facilities occurred in 1938 and 1939 at Lady Musgrave Island, including six cottages and other facilities.

In 1932 Captain Christian Poulsen, engaged in bringing fishing parties to the reef, realised the potential of Heron Island as a tourist attraction. In 1936 he bought the lease of the island for £290 and set up a tourist resort which is still in operation.

=== Islands as military target practice 1940s ===
East and West Fairfax Islands were used as a bombing range by the Royal Australian Air Force and Royal Australian Navy from the 1940s through to the 1960s.

It is likely that during World War II Lady Musgrave reef was also used for bombing practice "with the reef now practically a marine desert" as reported in 1952.

Historic and other shipwrecks, as well as an aircraft wreck, are located on several reefs surrounding the cays.

=== Current uses ===
A lighthouse was constructed on Lady Musgrave Island in April 1974.

Much of this area comes under the Capricornia Cays National Park with current usages including camping, permitted on three cays up to the following limits:

- North West Island 150 campers
- Lady Musgrave Island 50 campers
- Masthead Island 60 campers (30 from October to March)

The area also has many visits by both passing vessels cruising the Queensland cost and day trippers in fast jet catamarans (typically Lady Musgrave Island).

The area is also of significances as a fishery particularly for King Prawns.

== Geomorphology and landscape ==
The Capricorn and Bunker Cays form part of a distinct geomorphic province at the southern end of the Great Barrier Reef. The cays and their reefs lie on the western marginal shelf, and are separated from the mainland by the Curtis Channel. The cays are not generally visible from the mainland, although Masthead Island may be viewed from Mount Larcom on a clear day.

Geologically the cays are young, having developed during the Holocene period, they are mostly around 5000 years old. The sea level was much lower during the last ice age (at the end of the Pleistocene period) and the coastal plain on which today's reefs and cays developed was completely exposed. Early in the Holocene (around 10,000 years ago) the sea level began to rise, until it stabilised at its present level around 6000 years ago. Once the sea level stabilised, it was possible for reef flats to expand and provide potential sites for the formation of cays.

Four distinct reef types occur within the Capricorn and Bunker Groups

1. Platform Reefs:- Tyron, Wreck, North, Wilson, and Erskine Reefs.
2. Lagoonal Platform Reefs:- Heron, and One Tree Reefs.
3. Elongate Platform Reefs:- North West, and Masthead Reefs.
4. Closed Ring Reefs:- Lady Musgrave, Fairfax, and Hoskyn Reefs.

The cays occur on planar reefs of various sizes and with various levels of exposure to the prevailing winds. These factors have largely determined cay size and composition, which consists either of shingle, sand, or a mixture of both. Cay stability is profoundly affected by cyclonic disturbance.

The coral cays belong to two distinct types:

1. Vegetated sand cays:- North West, Heron, Masthead, Erskine, Wilson, Wreck, Tryon, North, Fairfax (West), and Hoskyn (West).
2. Shingle cays:- One Tree, Lady Musgrave, Fairfax (East), and Hoskyn (East).

The sand cays are all located to the lee of their reef flat, whereas the shingle cays, with the exception of Lady Musgrave, are located on the windward side. They vary in size, covering from one to 12 percent of the reef top surface area and there does not appear to be any correlation between island size, reef size, or stage of reef development.

== Fauna ==
=== Birds ===
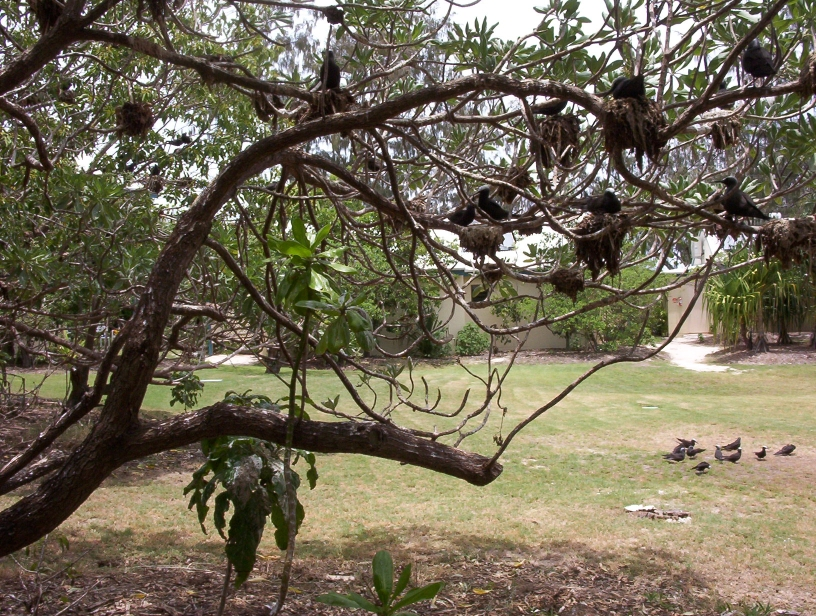
A Pisonia tree full of black noddy nests.

The Capricorn and Bunker Group contains 73–75 percent of all seabird biomass in the Great Barrier Reef World Heritage Area.

All the cays, except Broomfield Cay, have been identified as significant seabird breeding islands. In recent years, a colony of lesser crested tern Sterna bengalensis has used Broomfield Cay for breeding. Up to eight seabird species breed on Masthead Island, One Tree Island and Wreck Island, and seven species are recorded from Tryon Island, Erskine Island and Fairfax Islands.

The islands making up the Capricorn and Bunker Groups provide habitat for thousands of nesting seabirds, including

- Wedge-tailed shearwater (Puffinus pacificus)
- Southwestern black noddy (Anous minutus minutus),
- Northern silver gull (Larus novaehollandiae forsteri)
- Brown booby (Sula leucogaster)
- Black-naped tern (Sterna sumatrana)
- Bridled tern (Sterna anaethetus)
- Roseate tern (Sterna dougalli)

The breeding season is between October and April.

The white-bellied sea-eagle (Haliaeetus leucogaster) once nested on most of the cays and breeds during the winter months, nest sites are now restricted to Tryon, North West, Wilson, Wreck, East Fairfax and West Hoskyn Islands.

All-year resident and breeding within the group are:

- Common eastern reef egret (Egretta sacra sacra)
- Australian buff-banded rail (Gallirallus philippensis mellori)
- Common bar-shouldered dove (Geopelia humeralis humeralis)
- Australian sacred kingfisher (Todiramphus sanctus sanctus)
- Common black-faced cuckoo-shrike (Coracina novaehollandiae novaehollandiae)
- Capricorn silvereye (Zosterops lateralis chlorocephalus)

Migratory waders often sighted within the group include:

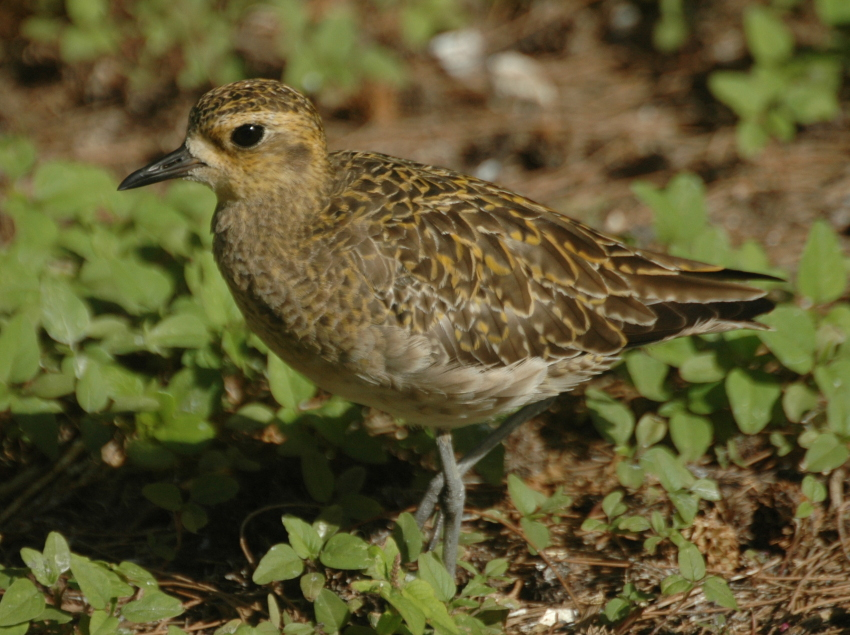
Non-breeding Pacific golden plover, Lady Elliot Island, Queensland, Australia

The bird family Charadriidae includes the plovers, dotterels, and lapwings,

- Pacific golden plover (Pluvialis fulva)
- Mongolian plover (Charadrius Mongolus)

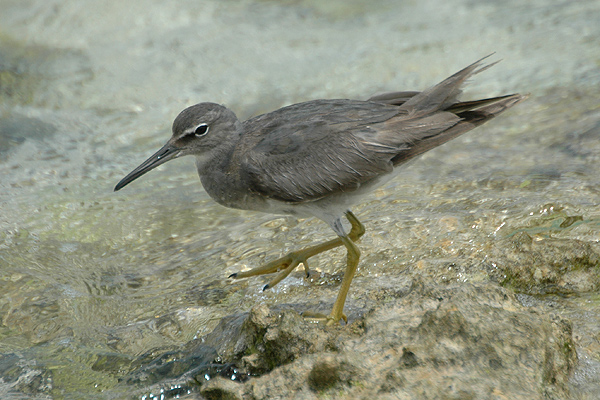
Wandering tattler on Great Barrier Reef in Queensland, Australia

As well as the Scolopacidae are which are a family of waders. Many of the smaller species are often called "sandpipers" and include curlews and snipes.

- Wandering tattler (Tringa brevipes)
- Grey-tailed tattler (Tringa incana)
- Bar-tailed godwit (Limosa lapponica)
- Black-tailed godwit Limosa limosa
- Ruddy turnstone (Arenaria interpres)
- Red-necked stint (Calidris ruficollis)
- Whimbrel (Numenius phaeopus)

Birds that often visit the group includes:

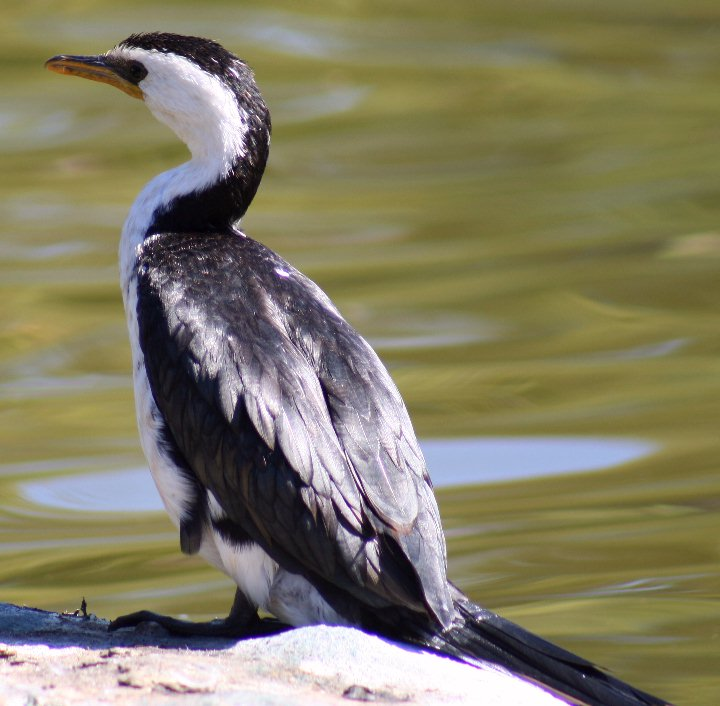
Little pied cormorant

The Haematopodidae or oystercatchers

- Pied oystercatcher (Haematopus longirostris)
- Sooty oystercatcher (Haematopus fuliginosus)

The bird family Phalacrocoracidae is represented by some 40 species of cormorants and shags 2 of which are regularly found in the area

- Little black cormorant (Phalacrocorax sulcirotris)
- Little pied cormorant (Phalacrocorax varius)

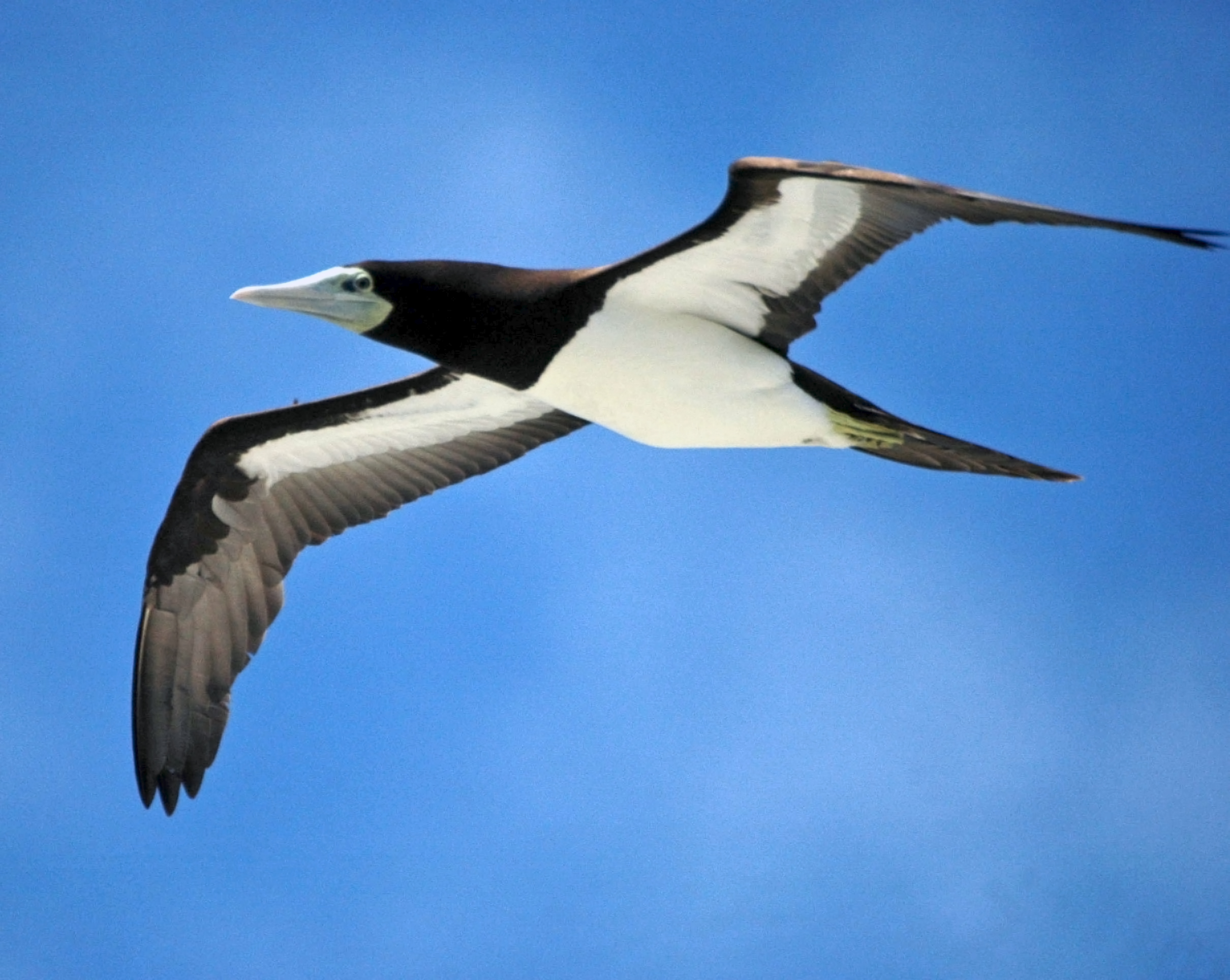
Brown booby, Lady Elliot Island, Queensland

The bird family Sulidae comprises the gannets and boobies. Both groups are medium-large coastal seabirds that plunge-dive for fish

- Brown booby (Sula leucogaster)

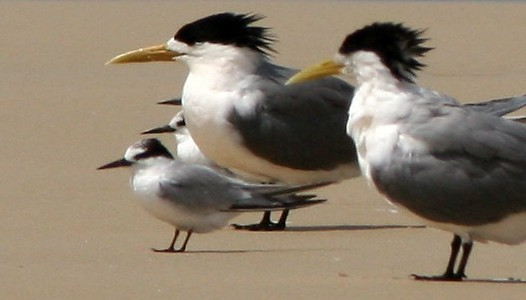
Crested terns Roosting with little terns, note size difference

Terns are seabirds in the family Sternidae, previously considered a subfamily (Sterninae) of the gull family Laridae. They form a lineage with the gulls and skimmers which in turn is related to skuas and auks. Terns have a worldwide distribution.

- Crested tern (Sterna bergii)
- Lesser crested tern (Sterna bengalensis)
- Black-naped tern (Sterna sumatrana)
- Roseate tern (Stern dougallii)
- Bridled tern (Sterna anaethetus)
- Little tern (Sterna albifrons)

The cuckoos are a family, Cuculidae, of near passerine birds. The order Cuculiformes, in addition to the cuckoos, also includes the turacos (family Musophagidae, sometimes treated as a separate order, Musophagiformes).

- Shining Bronze cuckoo (Chrysococcyx lucidus)

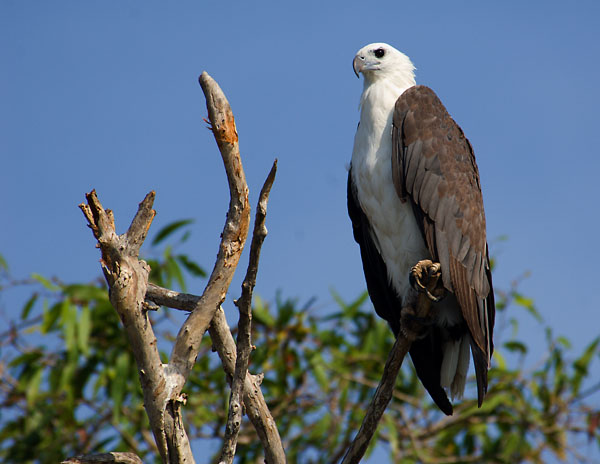
White-bellied sea-eagle

- White-bellied sea-eagle (Haliaeetus leucogaster)
- Australian hobby (Falco longipennis)
- Lesser frigatebird FREGATIDAE (Fregata ariel)

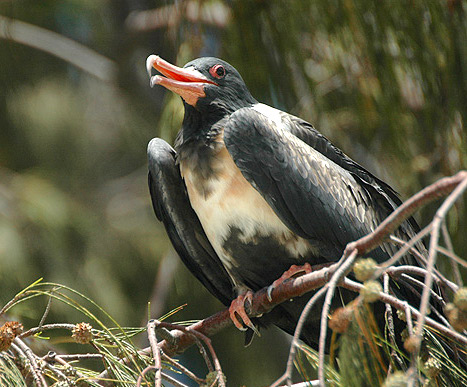
Lesser frigatebird

- Leaden flycatcher MUSCICAPIDAE (Myiagra rubecula)
- Peewee or Australian magpie lark GRALLINIDAE (Grallina cyanoleuca)
- House sparrow PASSERIDAE (Passer domesticus)
- Channel-billed cuckoo CUCULIDAE (Scythrops novaehollandiae)

== Known shipwrecks on the reefs ==
America a wooden ship of 391 tons and 108 feet in length. The vessel had been built in Quebec, Canada, in 1827, owned by James Gray and captained by Robert Donal. The vessel America had taken convicts to Sydney in 1829 and to Hobart in 1831.
But while en route from Sydney to Batavia in ballast, the vessel struck a reef near Wreck Island and was wrecked on 20 June 1831. The crew launched two boats and eventually reached Morton Bay. The whaling barque Nelson and the Caledonia were involved in salvage of anchors, spars and rigging.

Diana A wooden carvel schooner / brig of 103 tons and 70 feet in length built in Sydney in 1847 by the builder Ale and owned by C.L. Throck. The vessel ran aground on 1 June 1864 in the Bunker Group at the northwestern side of "middle island" (she was wrecked on Fairfax Island (middle island - Bunker group)) while loading guano.
The Diana was a vessel engaged in guano mining. The Boomerang sited the wreckage on the northwestern side of "middle Bunker island" on 13 August 1864 and the crew went ashore and found part of the wreck had been salvaged with equipment and tents hauled onto one of the islands and the wreck had broken into two parts with many timbers strewn about on the reef salvaged but no sign of life. The crew had been rescued by the schooner Caroline (also reported by press as Eleanor Palmer).

Pioneer Was wrecked on 12 March 1866 on Masthead Reef or Polmaise Reef. The 87-ton, 80-foot-long (24 m) two-masted schooner had been built in San Francisco in 1854. The Pioneer was a regular coasting schooner; during the 1860s she had been carrying a cargo of timber and no lives lost.
The vessel struck an outcrop of Masthead Reef on 12 March, an anchor was dropped but she dragged along the rocks until stopped by a large rock which pierced her bottom and held her upright. The crew launched a boat and sailed to Keppel Bay.

Britons Queen struck Masthead Reef/Polmaise Reef on 21 March 1866. The 80-foot-long (24 m) 2 masted schooner of 119 tons had been built in 1837 at Cowes on the Isle of Wight and was a regular coasting schooner during the 1850s and 1860s; it had on board a cargo of hides and tallow as well as 7 passengers.: All of the 14 passengers and crew landed safely on Masthead Island, then proceeded to Rockhampton.

Cosmopolite was wrecked on 15 October 1866 on Masthead Reef/Polmaise Reef. The vessel was a wooden carvel Brig of 145 tons and 85 feet in length and originally named David Henshaw built in Newcastle in Maine and had previously been registered at San Francisco (1849) at it arrived in Hobart on 17 April 1851 after having been purchased by Mr Boys for £700 stg.
When the vessel struck it had been in ballast and was salvaged with no lives lost. Bound from Sydney to Gladstone with cattle, she went ashore Masthead Reef and became a total wreck.

Willing Lass sunk 5 July 1868 on Masthead Reef or Polmaise Reef Brigantine (Barquentine?) of 107 tons and 81 feet in length. Built in Nova Scotia by Jam in 1852 the vessel was struck by a squall during a voyage from Rockhampton to Richmond River under the command of McNeil. A course was set to steer her ashore when the wind dropped, leaving her helpless to drift onto the reef where rising seas soon destroyed her no lives lost carrying ballast shallow site.

Jane Lockhart sunk between 11 and 17 December 1868 on Lady Musgrave Island / Heron Island / Masthead Reef or One Tree Island. The vessel was a two-masted schooner. Departed from Sydney with general cargo for Broadsound; and ran aground on Lady Musgrave Is; maybe on Heron Is or One Tree Island or Masthead Reef. Lost on a reef off Heron Island on the night of 17 December 1868. The crew took to the boat and safely reached the pilot station at Keppel Island.
The vessel was originally stated as having hit at Lady Musgrave reef (most unlikely) later news reports claim wreck on Heron Island with some other reports mention the wreck on either One Tree Island or Mast Head. The vessel was built in 1861 at Ulladulla New South Wales and registered in Sydney with the Official number of 36858 and a Registered number of 9/1861 with a gross tonnage of 80 tons and 82 feet in length

Hannah Broomfield a brigantine was lost on 30 April 1872 in the vicinity of the northern edge of the Capricorn Islands Most of her cargo and gear was recovered and the vessel was later refloated from Broomfield Reef but some time later wrecked in New Zealand in 1880. Built in the Tweed River of New South Wales in 1865 and registered in Wellington she had a gross tonnage of 120 tons and was 90 feet long

Polmaise was a barque which hit Polmaise Reef off Masthead Island on 2 February 1873. She was outward bound from Rockhampton for London with a general cargo the vessel was subsequently salvaged. It is believed that the wreck site has been found and it lies in shallow water. The vessel struck the reef and remained fast on falling tide. The master and most of the passengers left in the pinnace to obtain assistance, leaving the mate in charge. The Polmaise After which the reef in named was a wooden Barque of 753 tons and 171 feet in length was built by Ale in Dundee England in 1853
Abandoned when a vessel was sighted bearing down to their assistance.[LQ], [ASW6]

Agnes was a two-masted wooden schooner 82 feet in length and 96 tons. Built in Singapore in 1875 was wrecked on North Reef or Tryon Island reef on a voyage from Sydney to Townsville with general cargo of wool on 16 September 1878

Tambaroora on 22 July 1879 the steel steamship struck Polmaise Reef The steamship was 162 feet in length and 406 tons built in Glasgow in 1875, she was wrecked on Polmaise reef while on a voyage to Rockhampton from Sydney via Brisbane and Maryborough, carrying general cargo of grain/produce there were no deaths. The wreck was later purchased for 140 pounds and hopes were high that she could be refloated until examination showed her to be breaking up underwater She lies in shallow water about 100metres from the reef and her stern post comes very close to the surface, a hazard to boats trying to find the wreck. The wreck is mostly flattened but her boilers a compound single screw motor, rudder and propeller still remain making it a nice change from the reef dives in the area. Within 50metres of the Tambooroora lies the unidentified remains of a timber wreck and within half a mile lie two other wrecks of historical significance, including the wreck of the Polmaise, which the reef is named after, all four ships are declared historic shipwrecks

Deutschland A German wooden three-masted barque of 833 tons built in Ost Hammelwarden (Hamburg)., Germany in 1858 of 150 x 32 x 17.5 ft. hit Polmaise Reef on 22 July 1883 Carrying 1,000 tons of general cargo for Rockhampton from London including cast-iron screw piles for the Port Alma Wharf a church organ built to order in London for St. Pauls Church, this German barque ran onto Polmaise (Masthead?) Reef and eventually with plans underway to have her refloated but a gale on 29 September 1883 broke her up became a total loss. The cargo was salvaged during the same year by a large number of vessels the salvaged cargo was sold at auction in Rockhampton
The wreck has been found and lies in shallow water

Waterwitch a brigantine of 165 tons built 1873 stuck on 27 August 1884 Polmaise Reef or Masthead Reef

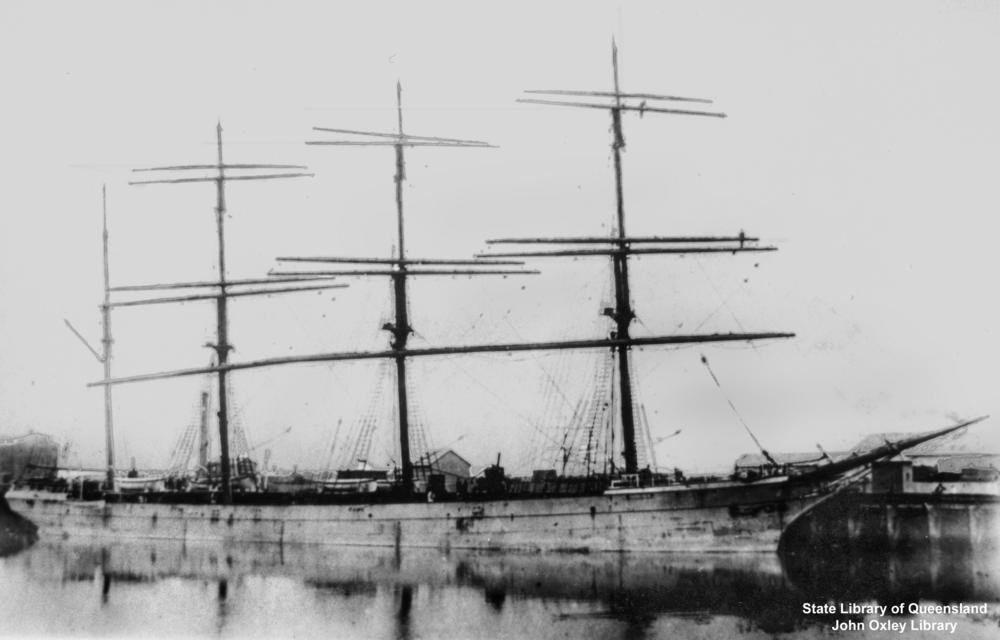
Bannockburn, brigantine which struck no. 1 Bunker Island while carrying a load of timber

Bannockburn an 85-foot-long (26 m), 110-ton brigantine built at Mechanic's Bay, Auckland in 1880 on 9 November 1884 struck no. 1 Bunker Island and was refloated after cargo (timber) salvaged, taken to Rockhampton. Eventually became a total loss due wrecking in Fitzroy River 1905.

Italy The 285-ton wooden 133-foot-long (41 m) barque built in Cardiff, Wales in 1867 on a voyage to Cooktown from Newcastle with coal struck a reef (Boult Reef) to the north of No.3 Island in the Bunker Group on 16 November 1885. The master and crew landed safely on the island and after a short rest proceeded to Gladstone. Following and enquiry the master and mate were severely censured.

Wisteria Sunk 14 September 1887. The wooden 131-foot (40 m) barque built as the 387-ton Look at Home in 1865 at Gloucester, Mass. On a voyage from Adelaide to Townsville with a cargo of flour, bran, chaff and cement broke up on One Tree Island. An inquiry found that her loss was caused by the incompetence of her master and mate. The master's certificate was cancelled.
Wreck site found in 1957 in twenty-eight metres. Only the anchor chain, windlass and cement barrels were found.

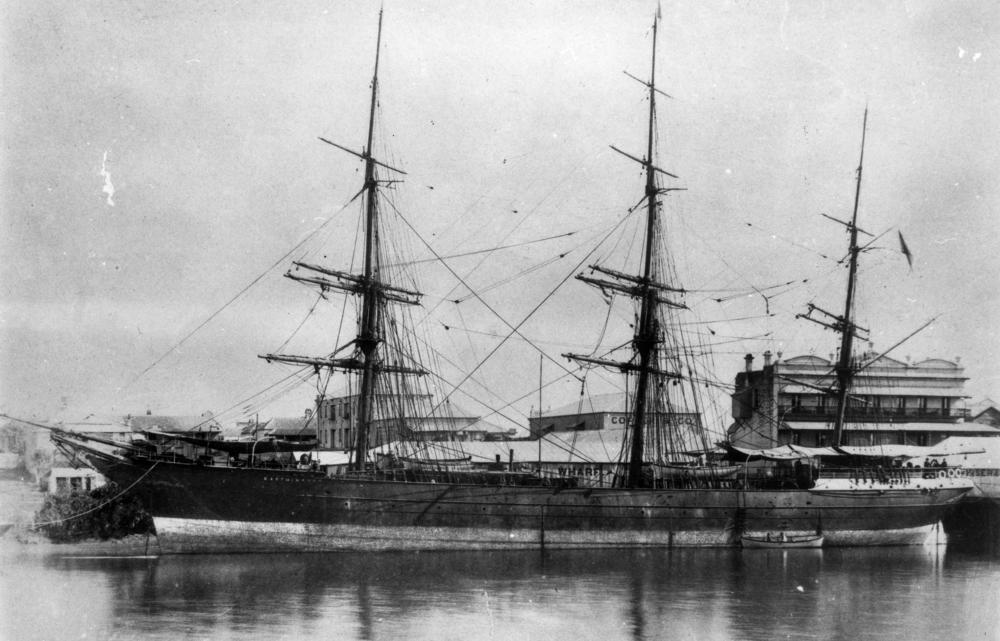
Eastminster, iron ship wrecked in 1888

Eastminster An iron emigrant vessel of 226 feet and 1208 tons Built in Glasgow in 1876 Last seen after departing Maryborough after ignoring a warning from the pilot but still headed out to sea in a rising gale on 17 February 1888 bound for Newcastle, presumed lost during cyclone; wreckage reported on a coral reef approx. 100 miles east of Rockhampton.
Louisa Lamont A wooden schooner of 74 tons and 81 feet built on the Williams River, NSW lost at Lamont Reef/Wistari Reef on 22 February 1888. The vessel salvaged and refloated and subsequently lost in Bass Strait March 1901.

Darcy Pratt on 21 January 1893 the wooden carvel brigantine / barquentine Darcy Pratt struck Polmaise Reef while on a voyage to New Zealand with cargo of bone/bone dust from Rockhampton; not salvaged. She was 96 feet long and 149 tons and built in Jervis Bay NSW in 1876

Progress on 29 May 1900 the 20-ton ketch Progress hit Polmaise reef on the southern side while carrying a cargo that included explosives. The vessel had left Brisbane on 23 May 1900 and as the vessel passed Bustard Head during the night on a North West course. At 2:30 am the vessel struck Polmaise Reef and was carried onto the reef by a strong spring ebb

Pacific The 132-foot, 252-ton screw steamer on 3 July 1903 was wrecked on Fitzroy Reef. The Steamer was specifically designed for transporting timber.

Norna On 15 June 1914, near Masthead Island the 89-ton two-masted wooden Schooner built at Brooklyn, New York in 1879 went aground.

Cooma was a steel passenger steamer of 3839 tons. She had a triple-expansion single screw and had been built 1907 for Howard Smith Line 330 x 46 x 21.4 ft.
While running from Brisbane to Cairns with passengers she ran gently on to North Reef near Heron Island, Queensland, 7 July 1926 and sent out an S.O.S call. The S.S.Burwah responded to her call and rescued her crew of 84 and 200 passengers. After several unsuccessful salvage attempts she was abandoned to the underwriters it was later gutted by fire on 26 January 1927. She now lies broken up and scattered over the reef and a few beams and machinery parts in the coral in 4 metres of water her boiler remains visible on the beach near the North reef lighthouse.

Joyce a 42-foot wooden motor vessel struck the southeast corner of Masthead Island on 4 April 1927.

Valante 28 January 1957 Masthead Island.

Kokotu motor vessel struck a reef off Lady Musgrave Island during cyclone Emily, 1 April 1972.

== See also ==
- Great Barrier Reef
- Capricornia Cays National Park
