= Lord Howe =

Lord Howe may refer to:

- Earl Howe (also Viscount Howe and Baron Howe), a peerage title in the United Kingdom, including:
  - Richard Howe, Earl Howe (1726–1799), Royal Navy officer and politician
- Geoffrey Howe (1926–2015), later Baron Howe of Aberavon, the longest-serving British cabinet minister under Margaret Thatcher

== Geography ==
- Lord Howe Island, an island in the Pacific Ocean administered by Australia
- Lord Howe Atoll, also known as Ontong Java Atoll (not to be confused with Lord Howe Island)
- Lord Howe Province, a marine biogeographic region of Australia
- Lord Howe Rise, an underwater plateau in the Pacific Ocean
- Lord Howe Seamount Chain, a seamount chain on northern Lord Howe Rise

== Biology ==
There are a number of species endemic to Lord Howe Island whose name includes the words Lord Howe:

=== Birds ===
- Lord Howe boobook, the extinct bird whose scientific name is Ninox novaeseelandiae albaria
- Lord Howe currawong or Strepera graculina crissalis
- Lord Howe fantail or Rhipidura fuliginosa cervina, extinct
- Lord Howe gerygone or Gerygone insularis, extinct
- Lord Howe golden whistler or Pachycephala pectoralis contempta
- Lord Howe morepork, another name for the Lord Howe boobook
- Lord Howe pigeon or Columba vitiensis godmanae, extinct
- Lord Howe red-crowned parakeet or Cyanoramphus novaezelandiae subflavescens, extinct
- Lord Howe silvereye or Zosterops lateralis tephropleurus
- Lord Howe starling or Aplonis fuscus hullianus, extinct
- Lord Howe swamphen or Porphyrio albus, extinct
- Lord Howe woodhen or Gallirallus sylvestris, endangered

=== Other species ===
- Lord Howe flax snail or Placostylus bivaricosus, an endangered snail
- Lord Howe Island butterflyfish or Amphichaetodon howensis, a fish
- Lord Howe Island skink or Cyclodina lichenigera, a lizard
- Lord Howe long-eared bat or Nyctophilus howensis, an extinct or endangered bat

== Other uses ==
- Lord Howe Monster, a fictional creature fought by Godzilla
- Lord Howe, a Scilly packet in service between Penzance and the Isles of Scilly
