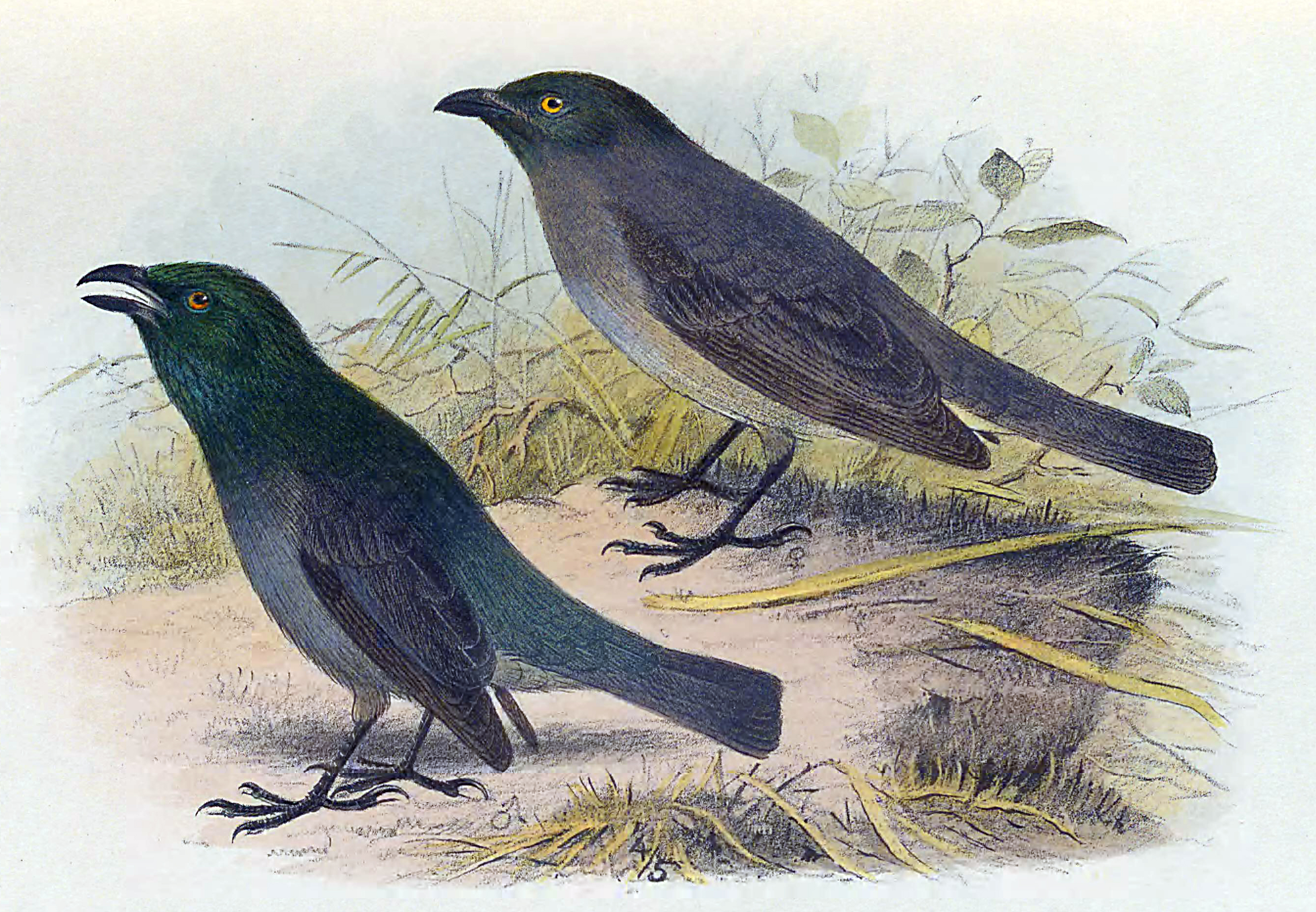
- Illustration of the Lord Howe starling

Conservation status
- Extinct (1923) (IUCN 3.1)

Scientific classification
- Kingdom: Animalia
- Phylum: Chordata
- Class: Aves
- Order: Passeriformes
- Family: Sturnidae
- Genus: Aplonis
- Species: †A. fusca

Binomial name
- †Aplonis fusca Gould, 1836

Synonyms
- Aplonis fuscus; Aplonis hulliana; Aplonis fusca hulliana

= Tasman starling =

Extinct species of bird

The Tasman starling (Aplonis fusca) was described in 1836 by John Gould as a species which occurred on both Norfolk Island and Lord Howe Island. In 1928 Australian ornithologist Gregory Mathews recognized that the plumage of the race from Lord Howe Island was much browner and more greyish than the plumage of the Norfolk Island race and split the species into two forms, the Norfolk starling (Aplonis fusca fusca), and the Lord Howe starling (Aplonis fusca hulliana). Both subspecies are now extinct, thus so the species.

== Description ==
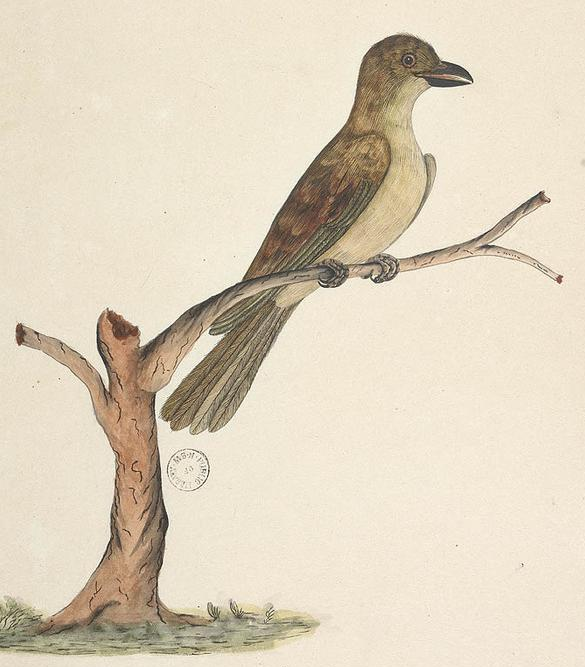
Norfolk Island Tasman starling (Aplonis fusca fusca), from the collection Drawings of birds chiefly from Australia, (1791-1792)

The Norfolk starling was 20 cm long. The wing length was 9.8 cm to 10.3 cm, the length of the tail was 6.3 to 6.8 cm, the length of the culmen 1.3 cm and tarsus was 2.5 cm. It was generally greyish brown. The males were glossy metallic green from head to the throat. The back, the rump, the uppertail coverts, the wing coverts, and underparts were grey, but undertail coverts were whitish. The bill was black and the eyes orange red. The females were coloured similarly but the greenish gloss were slightly duller and a grey throat contrasted with pale brownish flanks. The under breast was washed ochraceous. The abdomen and the undertail coverts were yellowish white.

The Lord Howe starling was 18 cm long. The head, the neck, the mantle and the throat were glossy metallic green. The back was slaty grey with a dull greenish gloss. The rump and the underparts were grey. The tail was grey with brownish tips to the feathers. The wings were rich brown. The iris was orange red.

== Distribution ==
The Norfolk starling was confined to Norfolk Island, an Australian territory in the Tasman Sea between Australia and New Zealand.

== Ecology ==
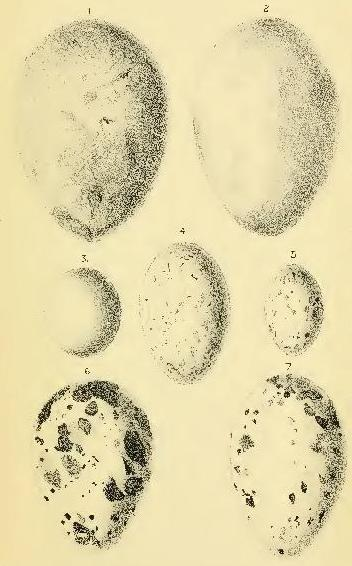
5: egg

The starlings were called "red-eyes" from their eye colour, or "cudgimeruk" from their distinctive calls, by the islanders. They were forest dwellers which lived and foraged in pairs. During the nesting period a clutch of four to five bluish green eggs with red blotches were laid in a nest in a hollow in a dead tree or tree fern.

== Extinction ==
The reasons for its extinction are unclear. Competition from introduced European starlings, song thrushes and common blackbirds, overhunting and habitat loss through agricultural clearing might have played important roles. Reports in older literature that it was driven to extinction by rats like its relative from Lord Howe Island are incorrect because rats did not become a pest on Norfolk Island until 1940, while the last living record of a Norfolk starling is from 1923.

The fate of the Lord Howe starling was sealed in June 1918 when the SS Makambo grounded at Ned's Beach, thus allowing black rats to leave the vessel and overrun the island. Within two years 40% of Lord Howe's endemic bird species were extinct, including the Lord Howe fantail, Lord Howe gerygone, and robust white-eye. The Lord Howe starling vanished by 1919.

== Bibliography ==
- Errol Fuller (2000). "Extinct Birds", ISBN 0-8160-1833-2
- Day, David - The Doomsday Book of Animals
- Greenway, James C. - Extinct and Vanishing Birds of the World
- Luther, Dieter - Die ausgestorbenen Vögel der Welt: Die neue Brehm-Bücherei 424
