= SS Makambo =

Steamship

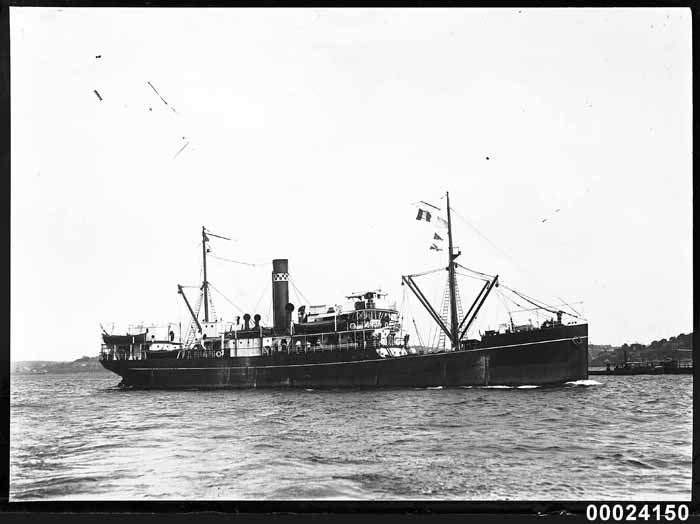
- Makambo at anchor

History
- Name: SS Makambo
- Owner: Burns Philp & Co. Ltd
- Builder: Clyde Shipbuilding Company, Port Glasgow
- Yard number: 273
- Launched: 16 March 1907
- In service: 1907
- Out of service: 12 June 1944
- Fate: Sunk off Phuket 12 June 1944

General characteristics
- Tonnage: 1,159 GRT
- Length: 210.3 ft (64.1 m)
- Beam: 31.4 ft (9.6 m)
- Installed power: Triple expansion engine

SS Makambo was a steamship first owned by Burns Philp & Co. Ltd. She was built in Port Glasgow in Scotland and named after an island in the Solomon Islands. She carried both passengers and cargo and was principally used on routes between eastern Australia and islands in Melanesia and the Tasman Sea. In November 1908 Jack and Charmian London travelled from Guadalcanal to Sydney on the Makambo after abandoning their ill-fated circumnavigation of the world on the Snark, a 45-foot (14 m) sailing yawl.

Between 1910 and 1931, she travelled a regular route between Sydney and Port Vila in the New Hebrides, with stops at Lord Howe Island and Norfolk Island. On 1 August 1921, Makambo's captain sent, by radio, the first report that flotsam from the missing cargo steamer SS Canastota had washed ashore at Lord Howe Island.

She was acquired in 1939 by Okada Gumi KK of Osaka, Japan, and renamed Kainan Maru. She was torpedoed and sunk on 12 June 1944 by the British submarine HMS Stoic off Phuket, Thailand.

== Grounding at Lord Howe Island ==
On 15 June 1918 Makambo ran aground near Neds Beach, at the northern end of Lord Howe Island. There was only one immediate casualty; a passenger, Miss Readon, was drowned when a boat capsized during the evacuation of passengers and crew from the vessel. The ship was only temporarily out of service until repairs could be made; however, Makambo was aground for nine days before she was refloated. The incident had allowed black rats to leave the ship and go ashore on the island, where they thrived. This introduction gave rise to an environmental disaster, with the rats causing the extinction of several of the island's endemic birds and other fauna in the next few years through predation, as well as causing hardship to the islanders by raiding their crops and only export commodity, the seeds of the kentia palm.

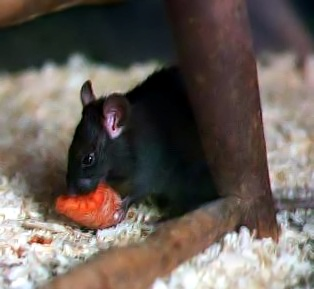
Black rat

Problems with the rats led to an attempted ecological solution through the deliberate introduction of Tasmanian masked owls between 1922 and 1930 to the island, an action which compounded the disaster by adding another predator to the ecosystem. Birds which became extinct soon after the arrival of rats include the Lord Howe Island thrush, Lord Howe gerygone, Lord Howe starling, Lord Howe fantail and robust white-eye. The Lord Howe boobook may have been eliminated by the introduced masked owls. Various seabirds were wiped out as breeding species on the main island, though they persist elsewhere. The giant Lord Howe Island stick insect also became extinct on the main island in 1920, and was believed to be completely gone until a tiny population of survivors was discovered on Ball's Pyramid in 2001 (there are plans to reintroduce them). Rats are also implicated in the population declines and extinctions of Lord Howe's endemic lizards, land snails and beetles.

Makambo Rock, north of Malabar Hill on Lord Howe Island, was named after the grounding of Makambo near there.
