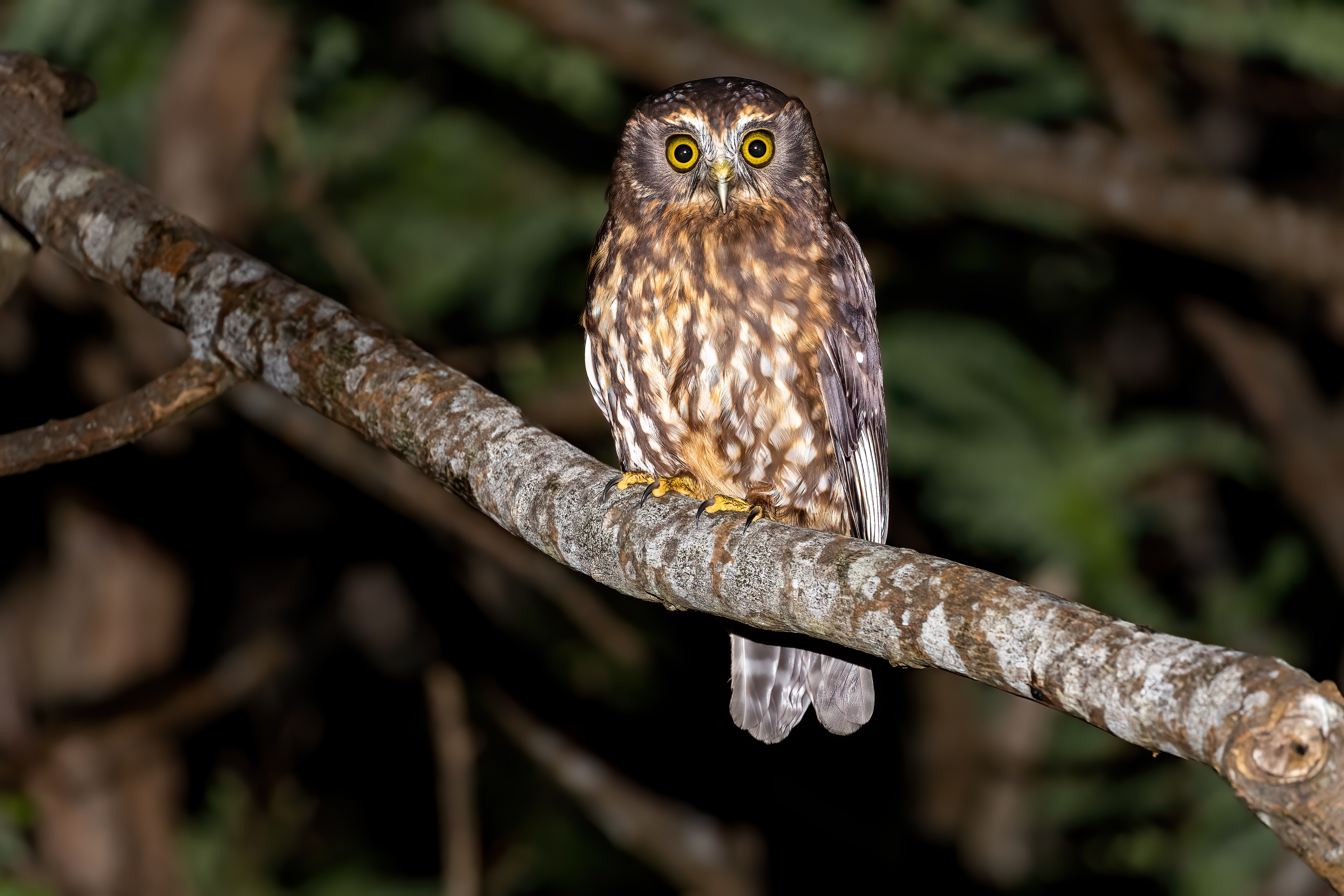
- Morepork in New Zealand

Conservation status
- Least Concern (IUCN 3.1)
- CITES Appendix II

Scientific classification
- Kingdom: Animalia
- Phylum: Chordata
- Class: Aves
- Order: Strigiformes
- Family: Strigidae
- Genus: Ninox
- Species: N. novaeseelandiae

Binomial name
- Ninox novaeseelandiae (Gmelin, JF, 1788)

Subspecies
- 2 extant, 1 extinct (see text)

Audio
- Recording of a morepork hooting

= Morepork =

Species of owl

The morepork (Ninox novaeseelandiae), also known by its Māori name ruru, is a small brown owl found in New Zealand, the Australian islands of Norfolk Island, and formerly on Lord Howe Island. Its names (also including boobook and mopoke) are onomatopoeic, owing to the species’ distinctive calls. Three subspecies of the morepork are recognised, one of which is extinct and another that exists only as a hybrid population.

First described by Johann Friedrich Gmelin in 1788, the morepork was thought to be the same species as the Australian boobook (N. boobook), native to Australia, Timor-Leste and New Guinea, something that endured for more than two hundred years, until 1999. Similarly, it was also considered the same as the Tasmanian boobook (N. leucopsis) until 2022.

The morepork has dark-brown plumage with prominent pale spots and golden-yellow eyes. Like most owls, the species is generally nocturnal, though may be crepuscular at times (or active at dawn and dusk), retiring to roost in secluded spots within the branches of trees. The morepork feeds on larger insects and small vertebrates, hunting by pouncing on them from tree perches. As with all owls, the morepork has supreme night vision and excellent hearing, able to locate a tiny lizard or rodent from many metres above and away. They then stealthily approach their targeted prey with near-silent flight, without flapping their wings, the prey often not even aware they are being pursued.

The International Union for Conservation of Nature (IUCN) has assessed the morepork's population and its potential for decline, and ranked the species as being of least concern (not currently at-risk), owing to its presently large range and apparently stable population.

== Taxonomy ==
The morepork was formally described in 1788 by the German naturalist Johann Friedrich Gmelin in his revised and expanded edition of Carl Linnaeus's Systema Naturae. He placed it with the other owls in the genus Strix and coined the binomial name Strix novaeseelandiae. Gmelin based his description on the "New Zeeland owl" from Queen Charlotte Sound that had been described in 1781 by the English ornithologist John Latham in his multi-volume A General Synopsis of Birds. Latham obtained his information from Johann Reinhold Forster who had accompanied James Cook on his second voyage to the Pacific Ocean. The morepork is now one of 37 owls placed in the genus Ninox that was introduced in 1837 by English naturalist Brian Houghton Hodgson. "Morepork" has been designated the official name by the International Ornithological Committee.

Three subspecies are recognised:

- N. n. novaeseelandiae (Gmelin, JF, 1788) – North and South Islands of New Zealand and Stewart Island
- N. n. undulata (Latham, 1801) – the Norfolk boobook, Norfolk Island (east of Australia)
- † N. n. albaria Ramsay, EP, 1888 – the Lord Howe boobook, Lord Howe Island (east of Australia) extinct

Both Gerlof Fokko Mees and Ernst Mayr regarded the taxonomy of the boobook owl as extremely challenging, the latter remarking in 1943 that it was "one of the most difficult problems I have ever encountered". In his 1968 book Nightwatchmen of the Bush and Plain, Australian naturalist David Fleay observed that the boobooks from Tasmania more closely resembled those of New Zealand than those from mainland Australia, though he followed Mees in treating them as a single species.

Janette Norman and colleagues tested the cytochrome b DNA of three subspecies (as well as the powerful and rufous owls) to ascertain whether the closest relative was used in breeding with the last surviving female of the Norfolk boobook. They discovered that although the Norfolk boobook was similar in plumage to the Tasmanian boobook, it was genetically much closer to the New Zealand subspecies. In fact, the two were so close genetically that they considered whether the Norfolk boobook should be recognised as a separate taxon at all, although they conceded the two were easily distinguishable in appearance, so maintained the three as subspecies; the Tasmanian boobook only diverged by 2.7% from the other two, while the powerful and rufous owls diverged by 4.4% from each other. Leading from this, the Australian boobook was split from the Tasmanian boobook and morepork in volume 5 of the Handbook of the Birds of the World; however, several authors, including Les Christidis and Walter Boles, contested that the data had been misinterpreted from the Norman study, which had not sampled any Australian mainland boobooks at all. They treated the three taxa (southern, Tasmanian boobooks, and moreporks) as a single species.

Examining both morphological and genetic (cytochrome b) characters, Michael Wink and colleagues concluded that the Australian boobook was distinct from the morepork, as was the Tasmanian boobook, which was raised to species status as Ninox leucopsis. In 2022, the International Ornithological Congress reclassified the Tasmanian boobook and morepork as distinct species.

== Description ==
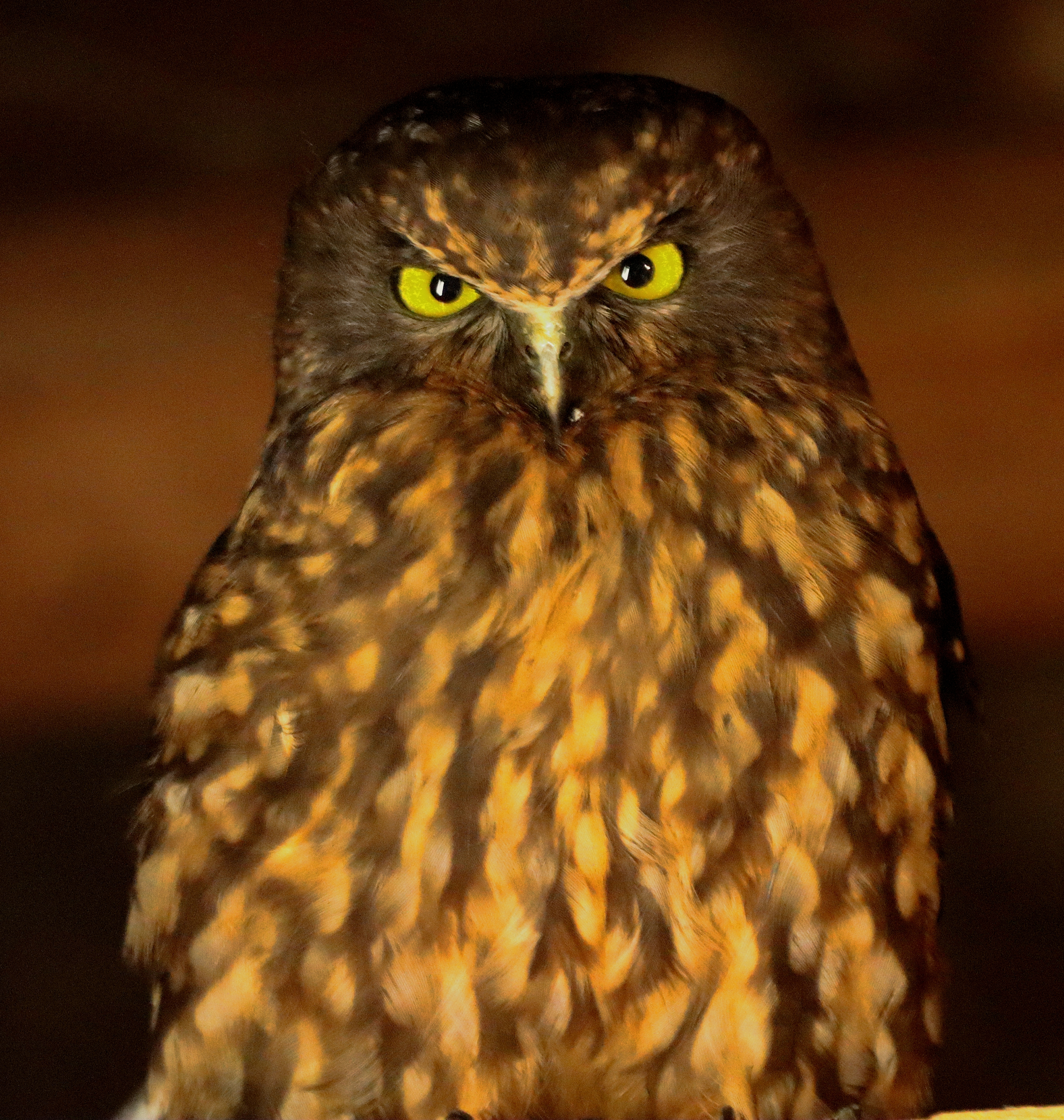
Morepork in New Zealand

The morepork is 26 to 29 cm (10 to 11.5 in) long, with the female slightly larger than the male. Females are slightly heavier at 170–216 g (6.0–7.6 oz) compared with the male's 140–156 g (4.9–5.5 oz). The morepork has generally dark brown head and upperparts, with pale brown spots on head and neck and white markings on the rest of the upperparts, with a pale yellow-white supercilium (eyebrow), dark brown ear coverts, and buff cheeks. The eyes are yellow to golden-yellow. The feathers of the chin and throat are buff with dark brown shafts. The feathers of the underparts are mostly dark brown with buff and white spots and streaks, with the larger markings on the belly making it look paler overall. The upper tail is dark brown with lighter brown bars. The cere and bill is pale blue-grey with a black cutting edge. The feet are orange or yellow with blackish claws.

Young moreporks do not attain adult plumage properly until their third or fourth year. The tips of juvenile's feathers are white and fluffy, remnants of the nestlings' down. These are worn away over time, persisting longest on the head. The feathers of the head, neck, and underparts are fluffier overall. Their plumage is a darker and more greyish brown overall than that of adults.

== Distribution and habitat ==
In New Zealand's North Island, it is common from Rangaunu Harbour south to southern Taranaki and west of Tauranga, Lake Taupō, and Whanganui, as well as between Murupara and the Hangaroa River in the northeast, and southern Manawatū, Wellington, and Wairarapa in the south, and uncommon outside these areas. In the South Island, it is more common west of the Southern Alps, around Marlborough and in Southland. It is common on Stewart Island and offshore islands.

In New Zealand, it primarily inhabits forests dominated by Podocarpus, Nothofagus, Metrosideros, and other hardwoods, up to the alpine tree line. On Norfolk Island, it lives in forests of Norfolk Island pine (Araucaria heterophylla).

== Behaviour ==
They are usually seen singly, in pairs, or in small family groups of an adult pair and up to three young.

Swamp harriers could feasibly prey on young moreporks.

During the day, moreporks sleep in roosts. Although mainly nocturnal, they are sometimes active at dawn and dusk. The main hunting times are evenings and mornings, with brief bursts of activity through the night. On dark nights, they often perch through the middle hours, and particularly if the weather is bad, may hunt by daylight, instead.

=== Breeding ===
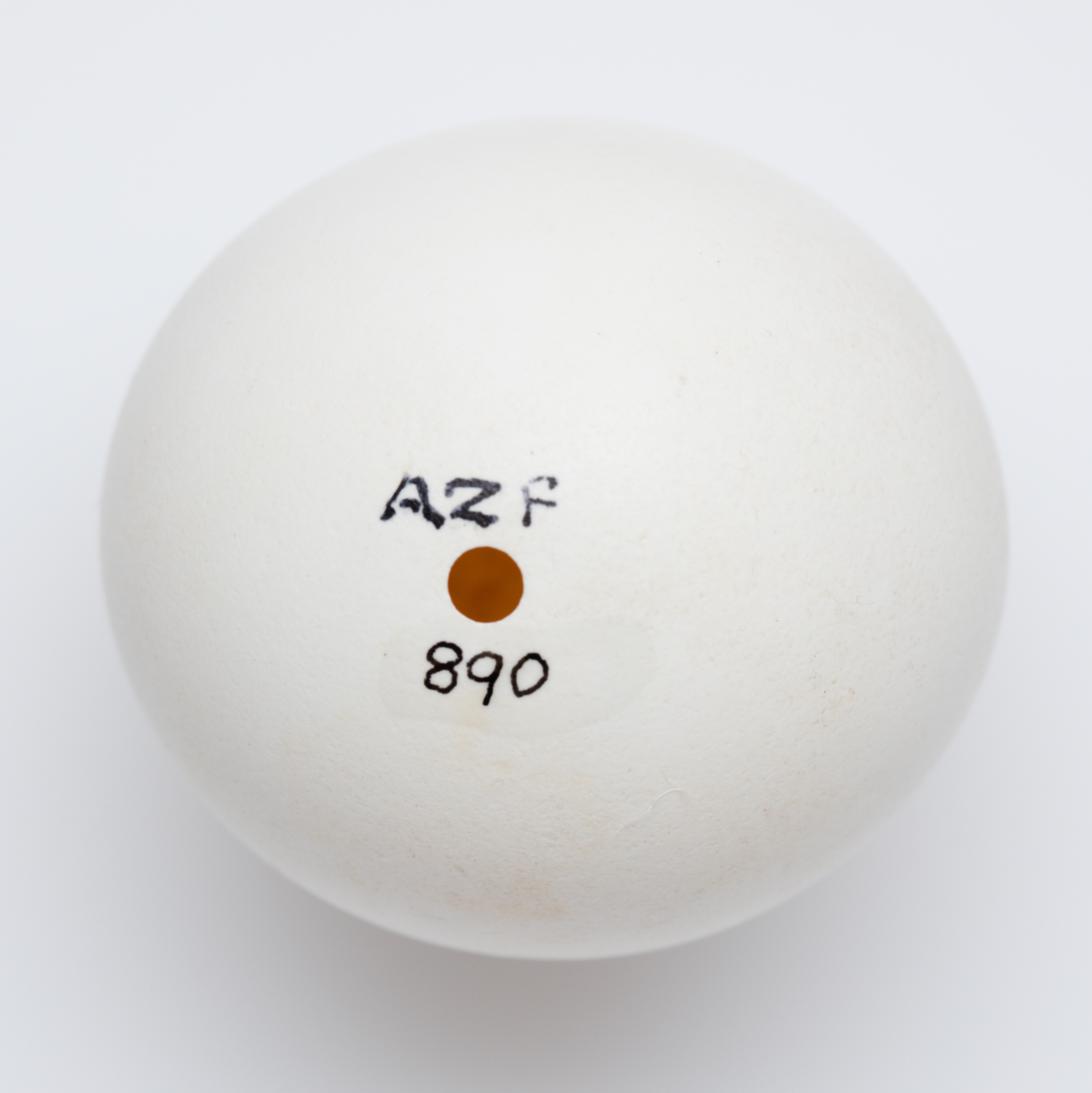
Morepork egg in the collection of Auckland Museum

Moreporks nest anywhere the trees are large enough to have hollows.

=== Feeding ===
Although their main hunting technique is perch-and-pounce, they are agile birds with a swift, goshawk-like wing action and the ability to maneuver rapidly when pursuing prey or hawking for insects.

They hunt a variety of animals – mainly large invertebrates including scarab and huhu beetles, moths and caterpillars, spiders, grasshoppers, and in New Zealand, wētā. They also take almost any suitably sized prey, particularly small birds, rats, and mice. They can find suitable food in pine forests as well as native forest.

=== Vocalisation ===
Morepork vocalising.

Moreporks have multiple distinct vocalisations. The "more-pork" call for which they are named is heard most frequently, but other vocalisations include a high pitched yelping call, a whistling call similar to kiwi, and a lower pitched "quork-quork" rumbling call. As many as 11 distinct calls have been observed by researchers.

== Conservation status ==
A widespread and generally common species, morepork is listed as being a species of least concern by the International Union for Conservation of Nature, on account of its large range and stable population, with no evidence of any significant decline. Like most species of owl, the morepork is protected under Appendix II of the Convention on International Trade in Endangered Species of Wild Fauna and Flora (CITES) meaning the international import and export of the species (including parts and derivatives) is regulated.

== Gallery ==
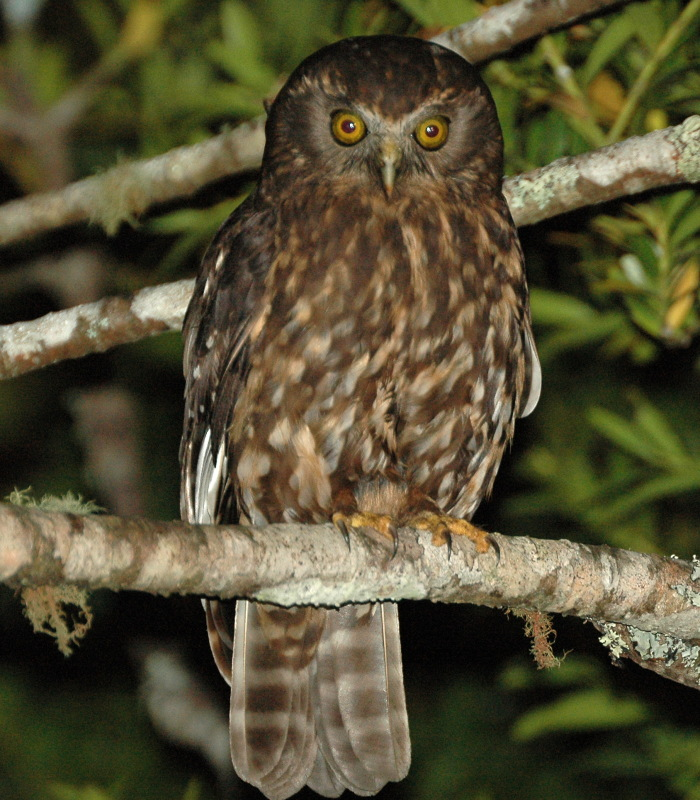
Morepork in Pohuehue, New Zealand

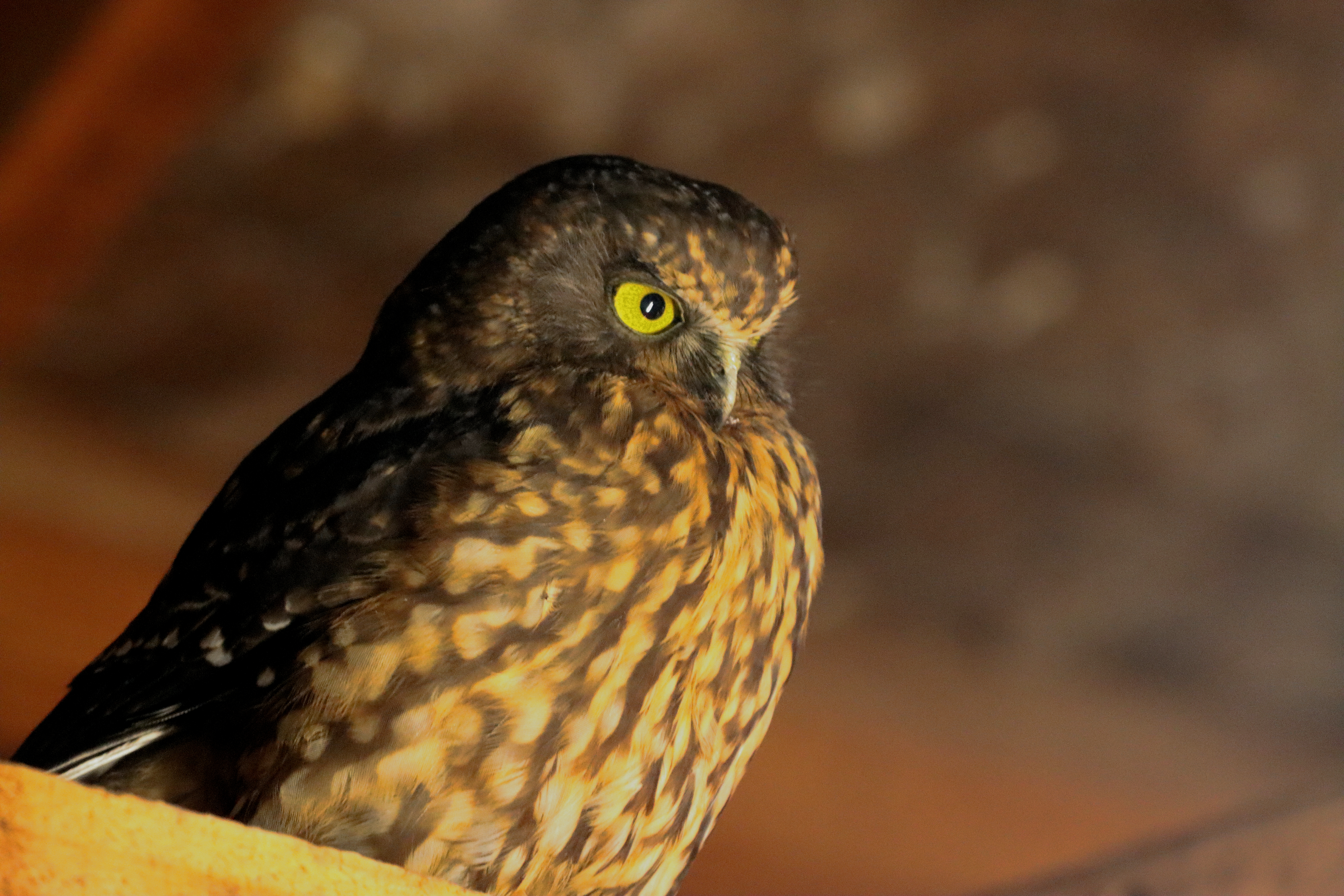
Morepork resting in a garage

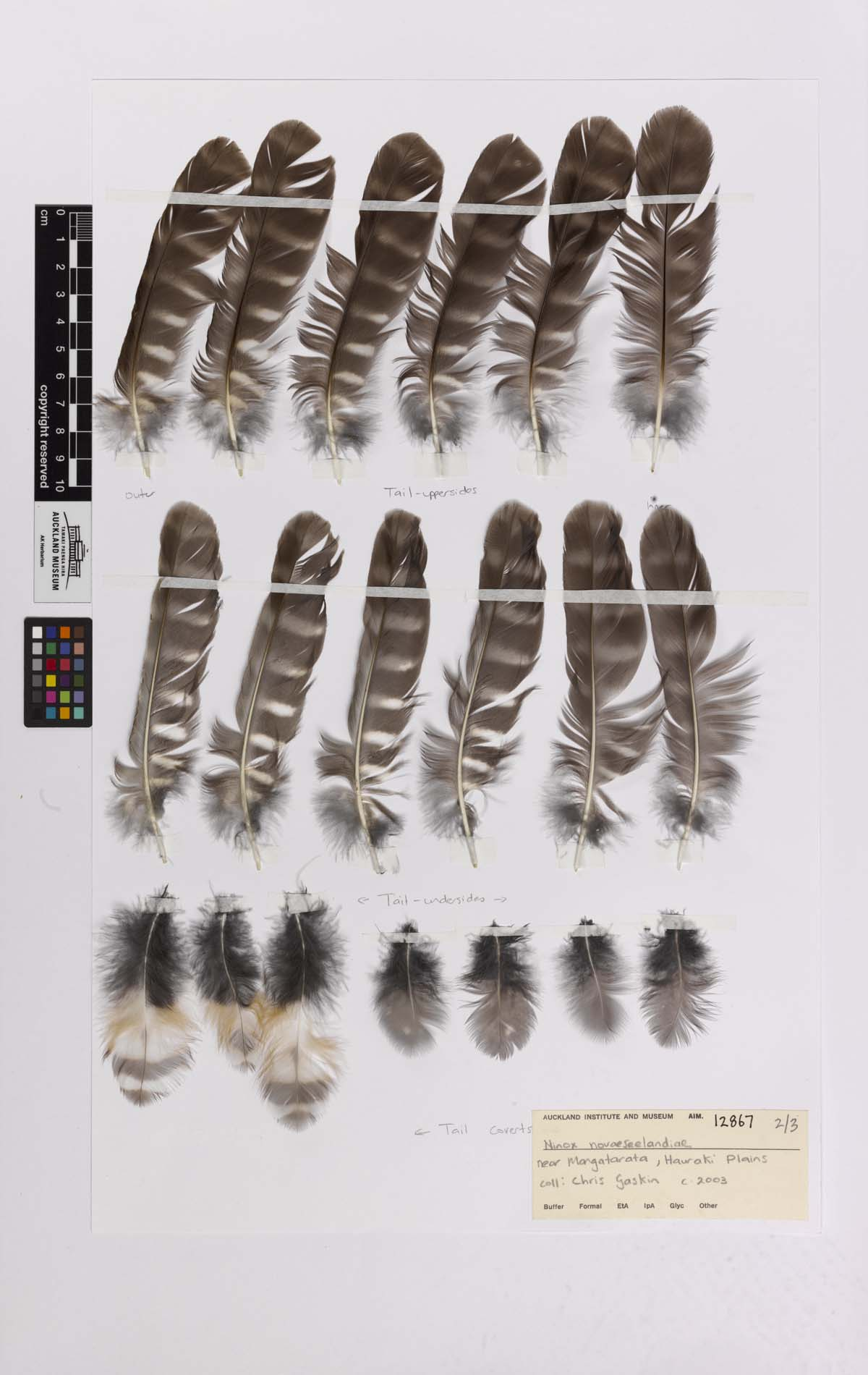
Display of feathers at Auckland Museum

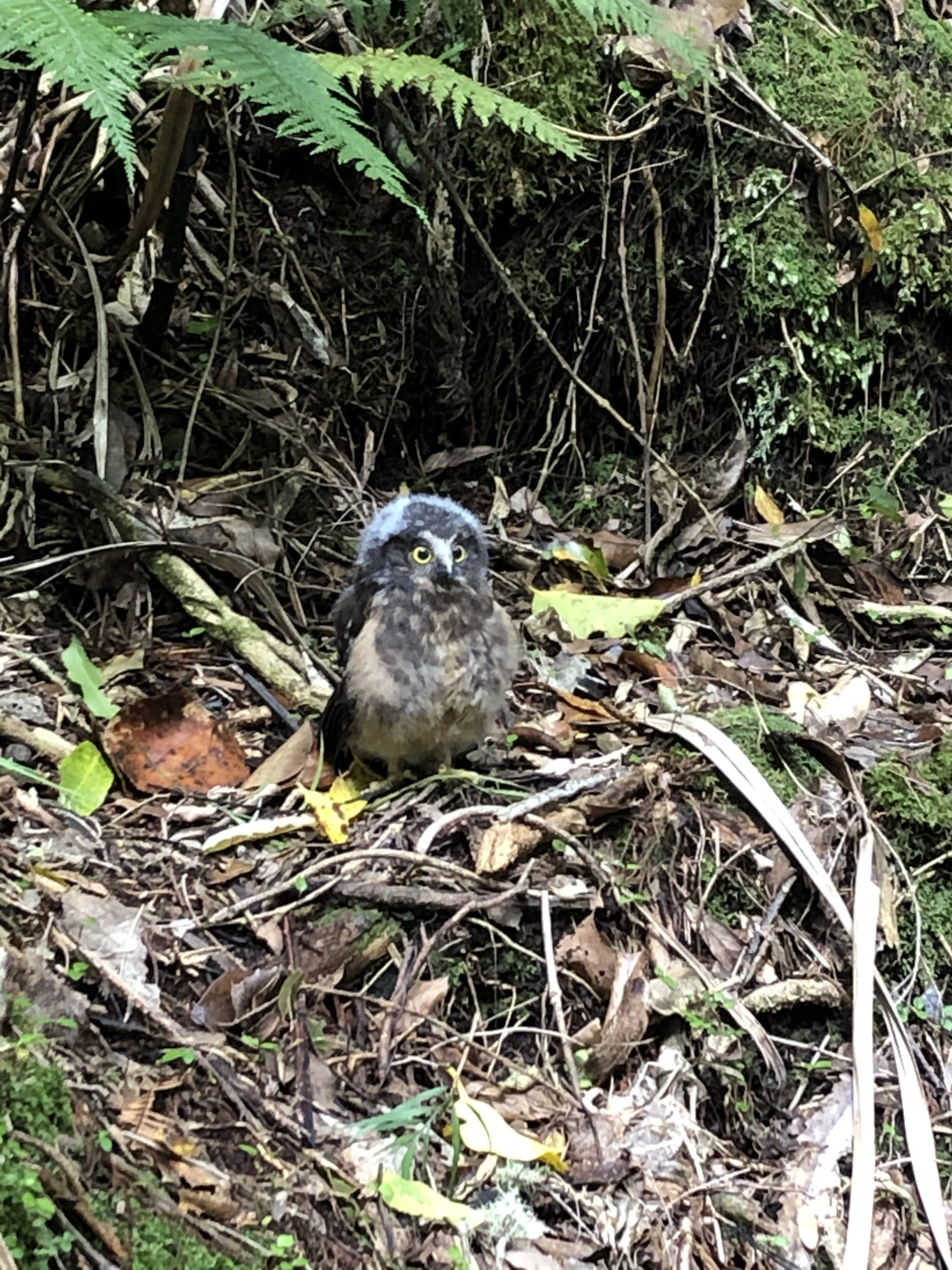
Morepork fledgling at Remutaka Forest Park, New Zealand

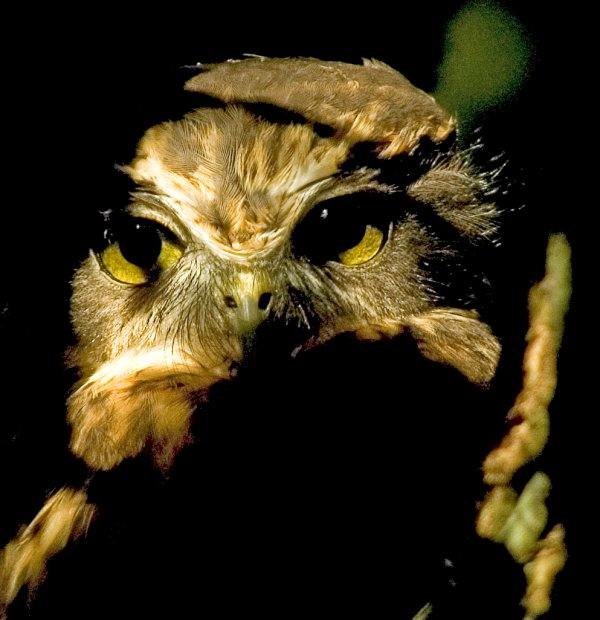
Morepork at Maungatautari, New Zealand

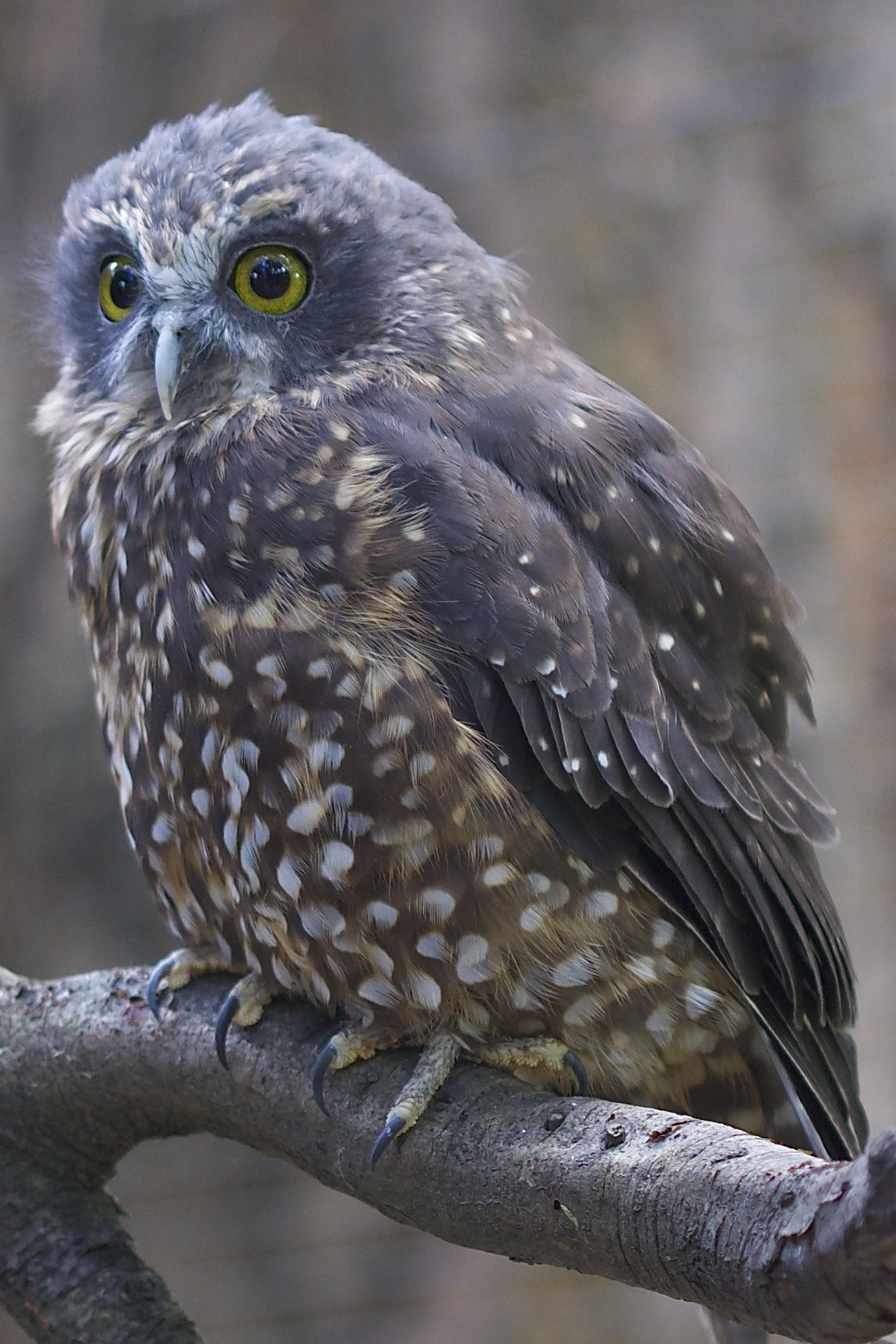
Morepork at Kiwi Birdlife Park, Queenstown, New Zealand
