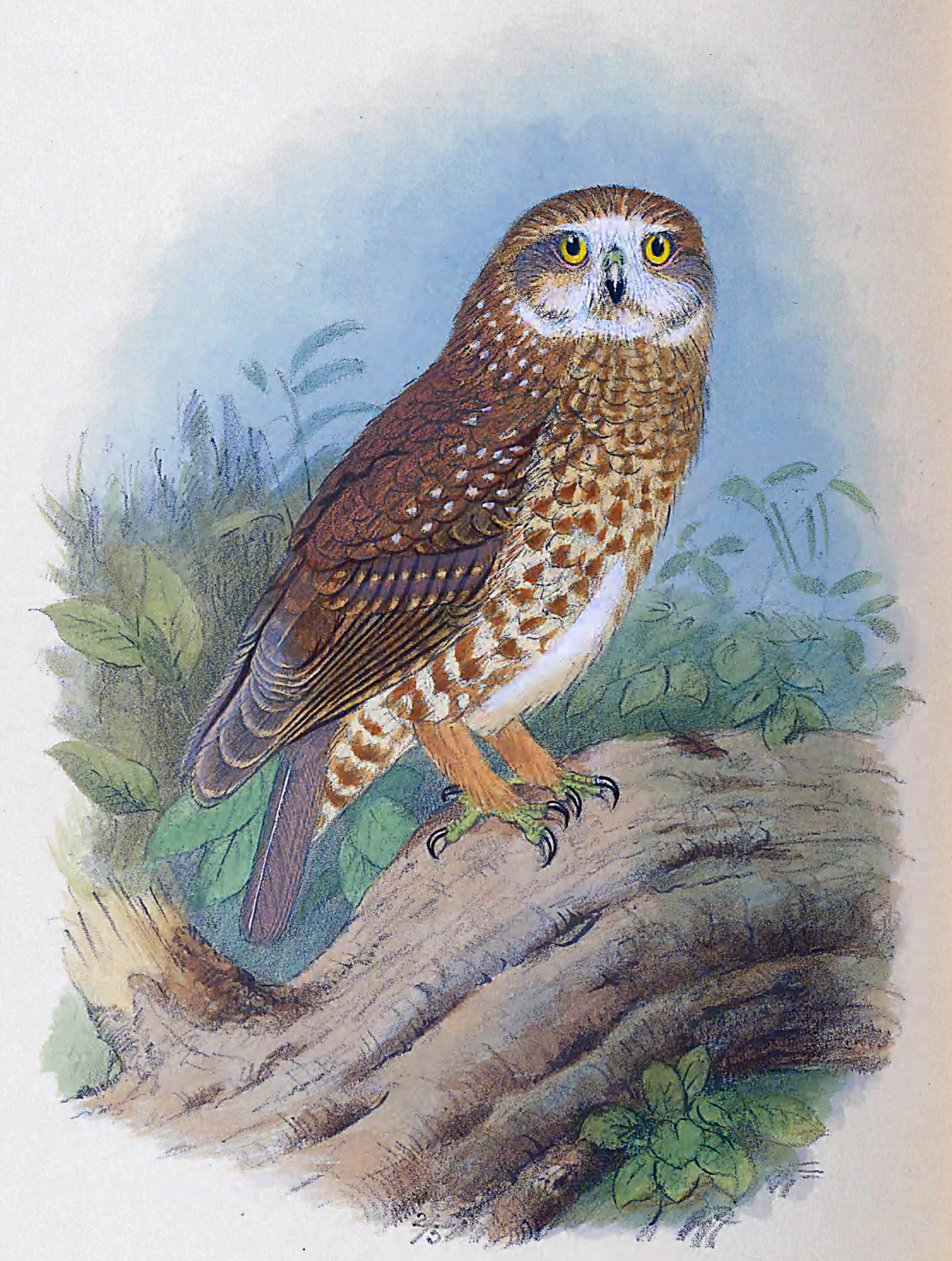
- Illustration by Henrik Grönvold

Conservation status
- Extinct (EPBC Act)

Scientific classification
- Kingdom: Animalia
- Phylum: Chordata
- Class: Aves
- Order: Strigiformes
- Family: Strigidae
- Genus: Ninox
- Species: N. novaeseelandiae
- Subspecies: N. n. albaria

Trinomial name
- Ninox novaeseelandiae albaria (Ramsay, 1888)

Synonyms
- Ninox albaria; Spiloglaux novae-seelandiae albaria

= Lord Howe boobook =

Extinct subspecies of bird

The Lord Howe boobook (Ninox novaeseelandiae albaria), also known as the Lord Howe morepork, was a bird in the true owl family endemic to Lord Howe Island in the Tasman Sea, part of New South Wales, Australia. It is an extinct and little-known subspecies of the morepork (Ninox novaeseelandiae).

== Description ==
The Lord Howe boobook was similar in appearance to other subspecies of the morepork, being a small, brown hawk owl with white-mottled plumage, paler than other subspecies. Measurements taken from museum specimens indicate that it was smaller than most mainland Australian subspecies of boobook but larger than both the New Zealand and Norfolk Island subspecies.

== Distribution and habitat ==
The Lord Howe boobook was restricted to Lord Howe Island where it inhabited the native forests as well as occurring around the settlements.

== Status and conservation ==
Exactly when the Lord Howe boobook became extinct is uncertain. Boobook calls were apparently heard on the island until the 1950s, but during the 1920s boobooks from near Sydney in eastern Australia had been introduced, along with barn owls and masked owls, in an unsuccessful effort to control the black rats that had overrun the island. The rats had been accidentally introduced in June 1918 with the grounding of the steamship SS Makambo, and several of Lord Howe's endemic birds disappeared during the next few years. The endemic boobook may have been extirpated by rat predation, owl predation or owl competition, and the calls heard until the 1950s may have come from either the endemic or the introduced boobook subspecies, or both.

Specimens of the Lord Howe boobook are held in the Australian Museum.
