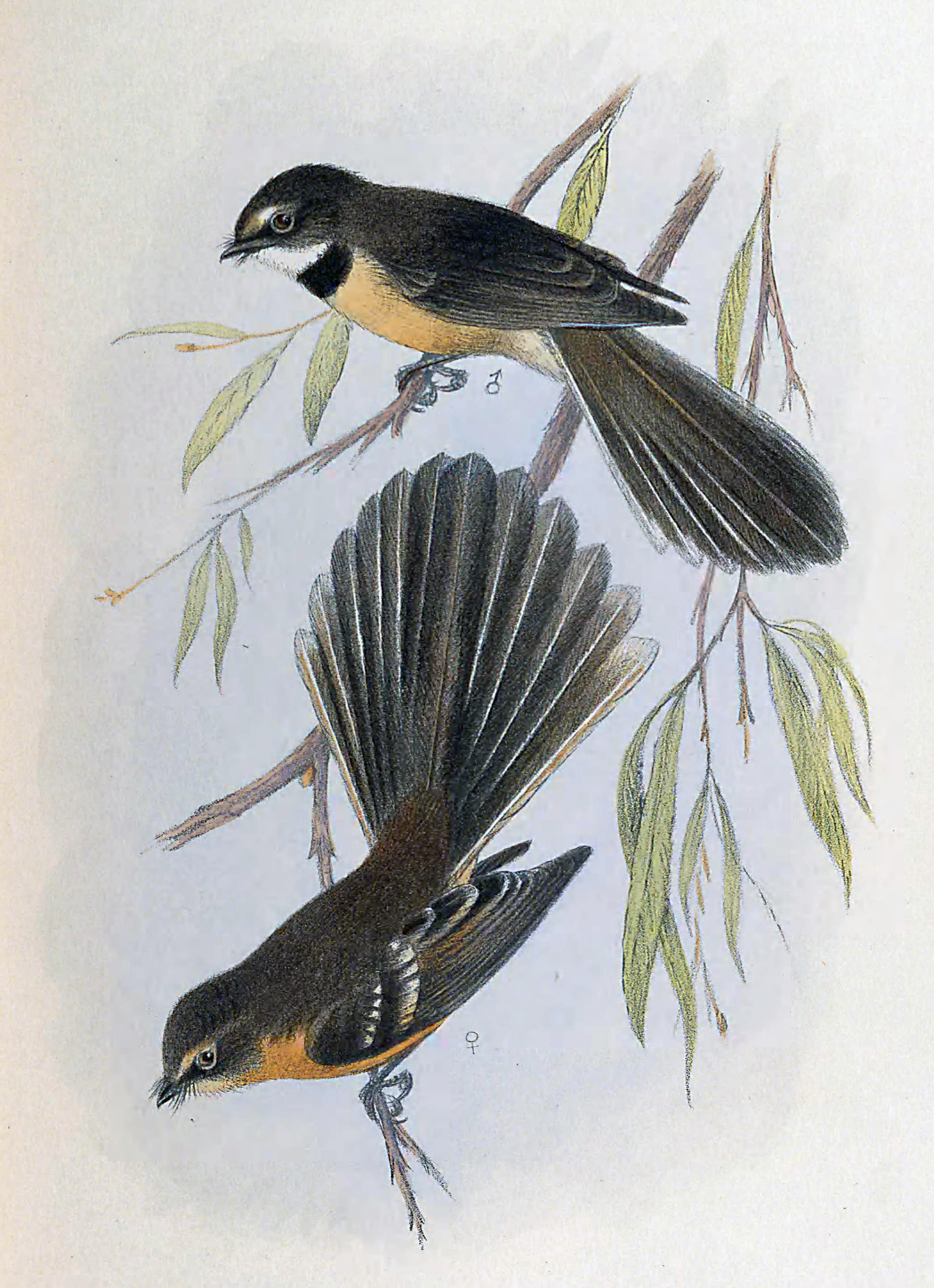

Conservation status
- Extinct (EPBC Act)

Scientific classification
- Kingdom: Animalia
- Phylum: Chordata
- Class: Aves
- Order: Passeriformes
- Family: Rhipiduridae
- Genus: Rhipidura
- Species: R. fuliginosa
- Subspecies: †R. f. cervina

Trinomial name
- †Rhipidura fuliginosa cervina Ramsay, 1879

Synonyms
- Rhipidura cervina

= Lord Howe fantail =

Extinct subspecies of bird

The Lord Howe fantail (Rhipidura fuliginosa cervina), also known as the Lord Howe Island fantail or fawn-breasted fantail, is an extinct subspecies of the New Zealand fantail (Rhipidura fuliginosa). It was endemic to Lord Howe Island in the Tasman Sea, part of New South Wales, Australia.

== Description ==
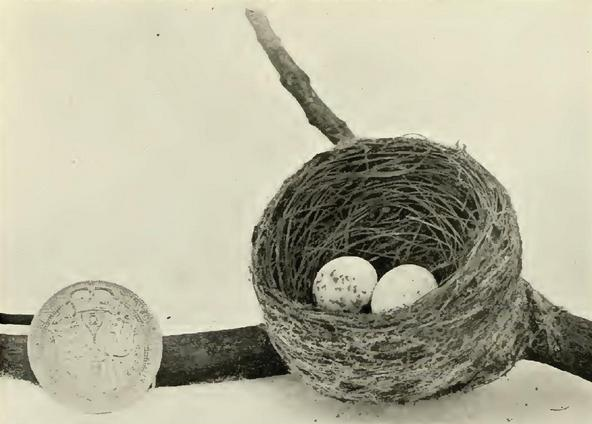
Nest

The Lord Howe fantail has sometimes been treated as a full species. It differed from the other subspecies by its entire underparts being light cinnamon-brown, with a paler throat, lacking the white throat with the dark bar delimiting it from the breast.

== Distribution and habitat ==
The Lord Howe fantail was restricted to Lord Howe Island, where it inhabited the native subtropical rainforest.

== Behaviour ==
The birds were very tame, commonly seen around buildings which they often entered in search of insects.

=== Breeding ===
The fantail built a cup-shaped nest, with a rudimentary tail, of decayed wood fibre and grass, bound with cobwebs and lined with fine grass, situated on a horizontal branch. The clutch was usually three, sometimes two, eggs.

== Extinction ==
The Lord Howe fantail was reported as common in 1909 but disappeared not long after black rats were accidentally introduced to the island with the grounding of the ship SS Makambo there in June 1918. It was reported in 1924 that the birds were "practically wiped out" and there are no records from subsequent years. The fantail was only one of a suite of Lord Howe's endemic birds and other fauna exterminated by rat predation.
