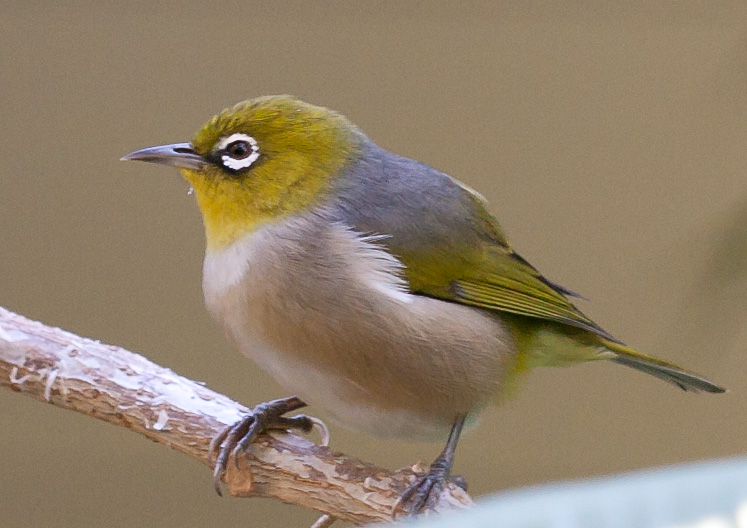

Scientific classification
- Kingdom: Animalia
- Phylum: Chordata
- Class: Aves
- Order: Passeriformes
- Family: Zosteropidae
- Genus: Zosterops
- Species: Z. lateralis
- Subspecies: Z. l. tephropleurus

Trinomial name
- Zosterops lateralis tephropleurus Gould, 1855

Synonyms
- Zosterops tephropleura; Zosterops tephropleurus

= Lord Howe silvereye =

Subspecies of bird

The Lord Howe silvereye (Zosterops lateralis tephropleurus), also known as the Lord Howe white-eye, Lord Howe Island white-eye or, locally, as the "Little Grinnell", is a small bird in the white-eye family, Zosteropidae. It is a subspecies of the silvereye (Zosterops lateralis), though sometimes considered a full species. It is endemic to Lord Howe Island in the Tasman Sea, part of New South Wales, Australia.

== Description ==
The Lord Howe silvereye is sometimes treated as a full species. It differs from the nominate subspecies by being more robust, with larger feet and claws, a longer and heavier bill, with much olive-green on flanks, rump and lower back, and with canary yellow under-tail coverts.

== Distribution and habitat ==
The Lord Howe silvereye is restricted to Lord Howe Island, where it widely distributed through the native subtropical rainforest as well as around homes and gardens.

== Behaviour ==
=== Breeding ===
The bird builds a small cup-shaped nest of palm fibre, grass and spider webs, in which it lays a clutch of 2-4 small eggs in spring and summer.

=== Feeding ===
The silvereyes glean insects from leaves and flowers, as well as eating small seeds, nectar and fruits, particularly guava and will come into gardens and houses, in which people may feed them mince meat and food scraps.

== Status and conservation ==
The population of the Lord Howe silvereye has been estimated at 5,000 breeding birds and stable. It is considered Vulnerable because of the restricted size of the population and area of its distribution.
