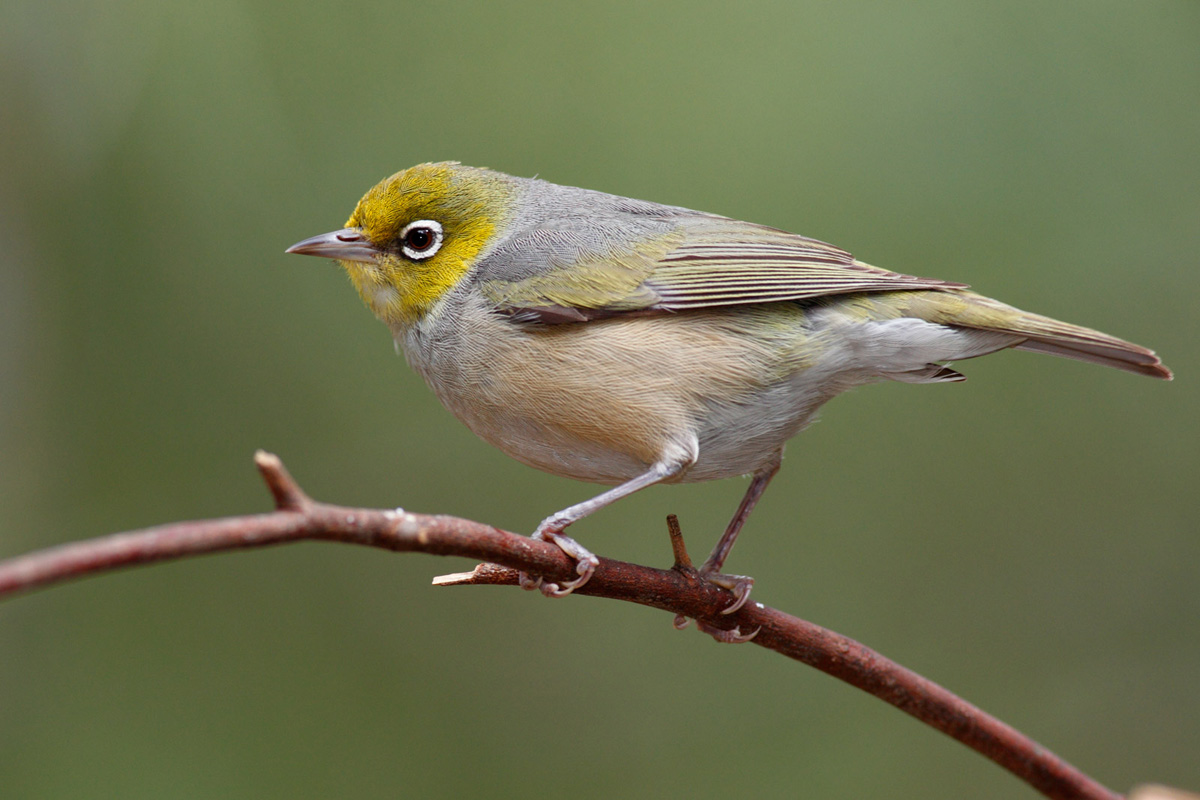

Conservation status
- Least Concern (IUCN 3.1)

Scientific classification
- Kingdom: Animalia
- Phylum: Chordata
- Class: Aves
- Order: Passeriformes
- Family: Zosteropidae
- Genus: Zosterops
- Species: Z. lateralis

Binomial name
- Zosterops lateralis (Latham, 1801)
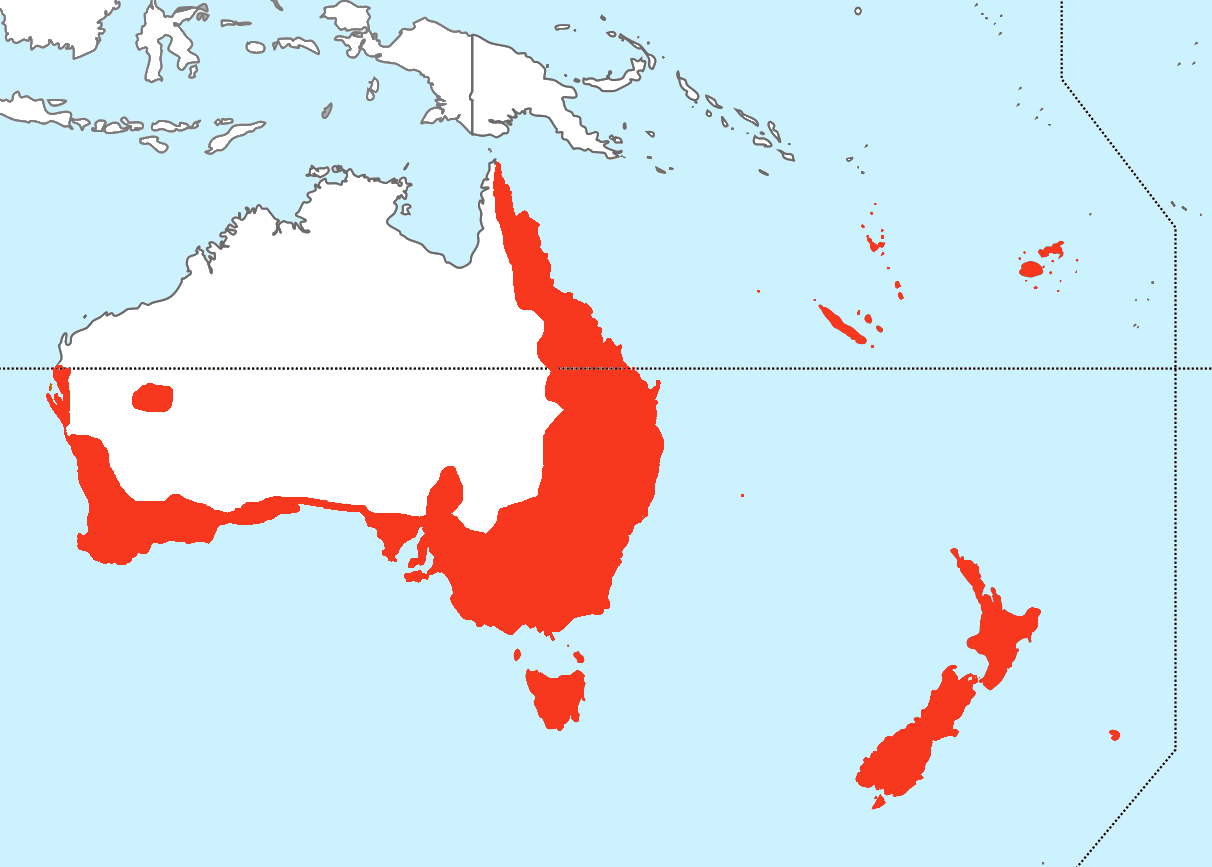

= Silvereye =

Species of bird

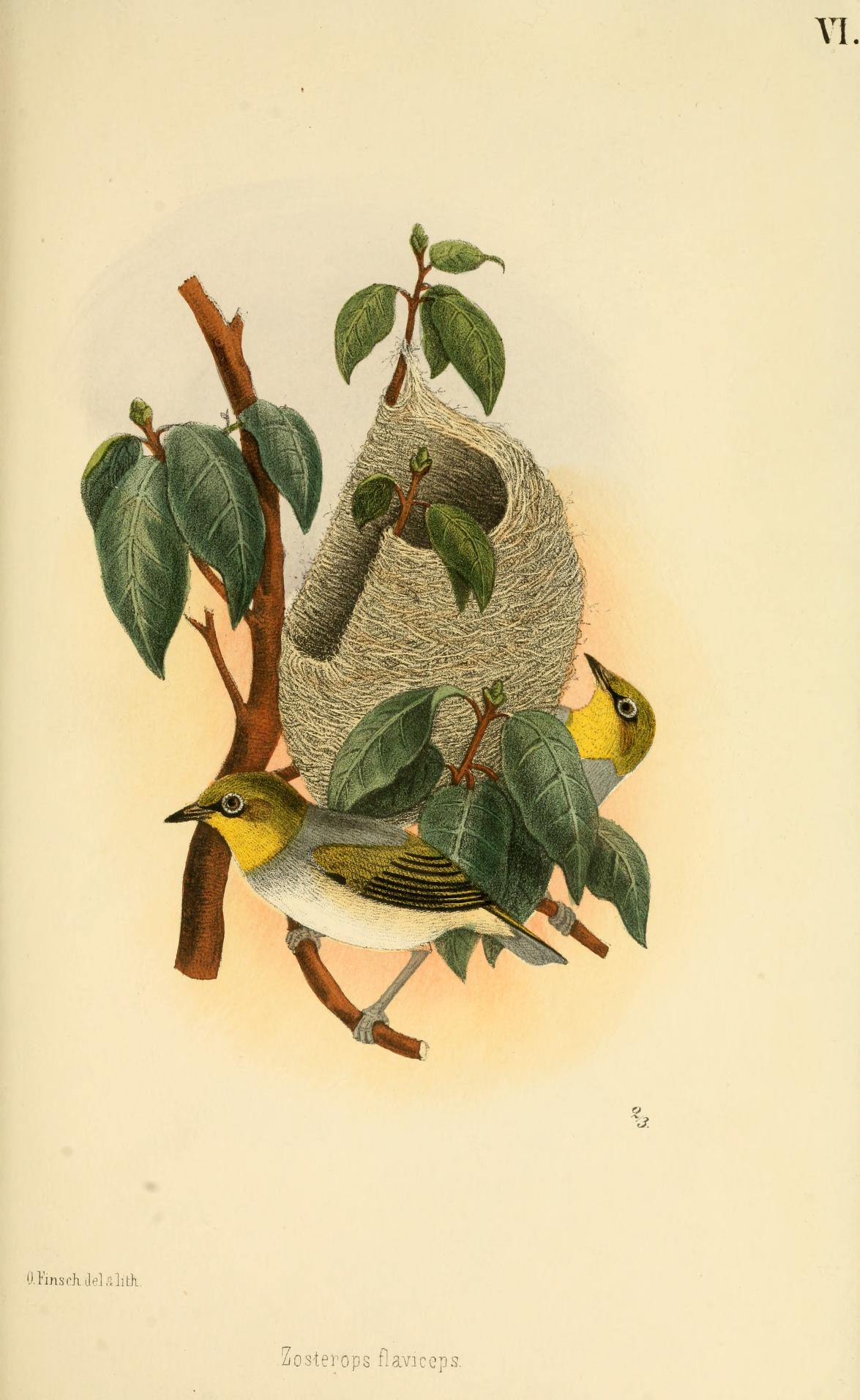
Subspecies flaviceps from Fiji

The silvereye or wax-eye (Zosterops lateralis), also known by its Māori name tauhou, is a very small omnivorous passerine bird of the south-west Pacific. In Australia and New Zealand its common name is sometimes white-eye, but this name is more commonly used to refer to all members of the genus Zosterops, or the entire family Zosteropidae.

In New Zealand, the silvereye was first recorded in 1832. It arrived in greater numbers in 1856, and it is assumed that a migrating flock was swept eastwards by a storm. As an apparently self-introduced bird it is protected as a native New Zealand species. Its Māori name, tauhou, means "stranger" or more literally, "new arrival".

== Taxonomy ==
The silvereye was first described by the English ornithologist John Latham in 1801 under the binomial name Sylvia lateralis. There are 17 subspecies:

- Z. l. chlorocephalus A. J. Campbell & S. A. White, 1910 (Capricorn silvereye)– Capricorn and Bunker Group, central Queensland, Australia
- Z. l. chloronotus Gould, 1841 (western silvereye) – south-west Western Australia from Carnarvon southwards coastally and subcoastally to South Australia at the head of the Great Australian Bight
- Z. l. cornwalli Mathews, 1912 – east-central and south-east Queensland to north-east New South Wales
- Z. l. flaviceps Peale, 1848 – Fiji
- Z. l. griseonota G. R. Gray, 1859 – New Caledonia
- Z. l. lateralis (Latham, 1801) – Flinders Island, Tasmania; Norfolk Island; New Zealand and Chatham Islands; also a non-breeding migrant to continental south-eastern Australia
- Z. l. macmillani Mayr, 1937 – Tanna and Aniwa Islands (southern Vanuatu)
- Z. l. melanops G. R. Gray, 1860 – Lifou, Loyalty Islands, New Caledonia
- Z. l. nigrescens F. Sarasin, 1913 – Loyalty Islands, New Caledonia
- Z. l. ochrochrous Schodde & Mason, 1999 – King Island, Tasmania
- Z. l. pinarochrous Schodde & Mason, 1999 – south-east South Australia, south-west New South Wales and western Victoria
- Z. l. tephropleurus Gould, 1855 (Lord Howe silvereye) – Lord Howe Island
- Z. l. tropicus Mees, 1969 – Torres Islands and Banks Islands (except Mota Lava), and Malo and Espíritu Santo, north-west Vanuatu
- Z. l. valuensis Murphy & Mathews, 1929 – Mota Lava, Banks Islands, Vanuatu
- Z. l. vatensis Tristram, 1879 – central and southern Vanuatu
- Z. l. vegetus E. J. O. Hartert, 1899 – north-east Queensland
- Z. l. westernensis (Quoy & Gaimard, 1830) – south-east New South Wales to eastern Victoria

== Description ==
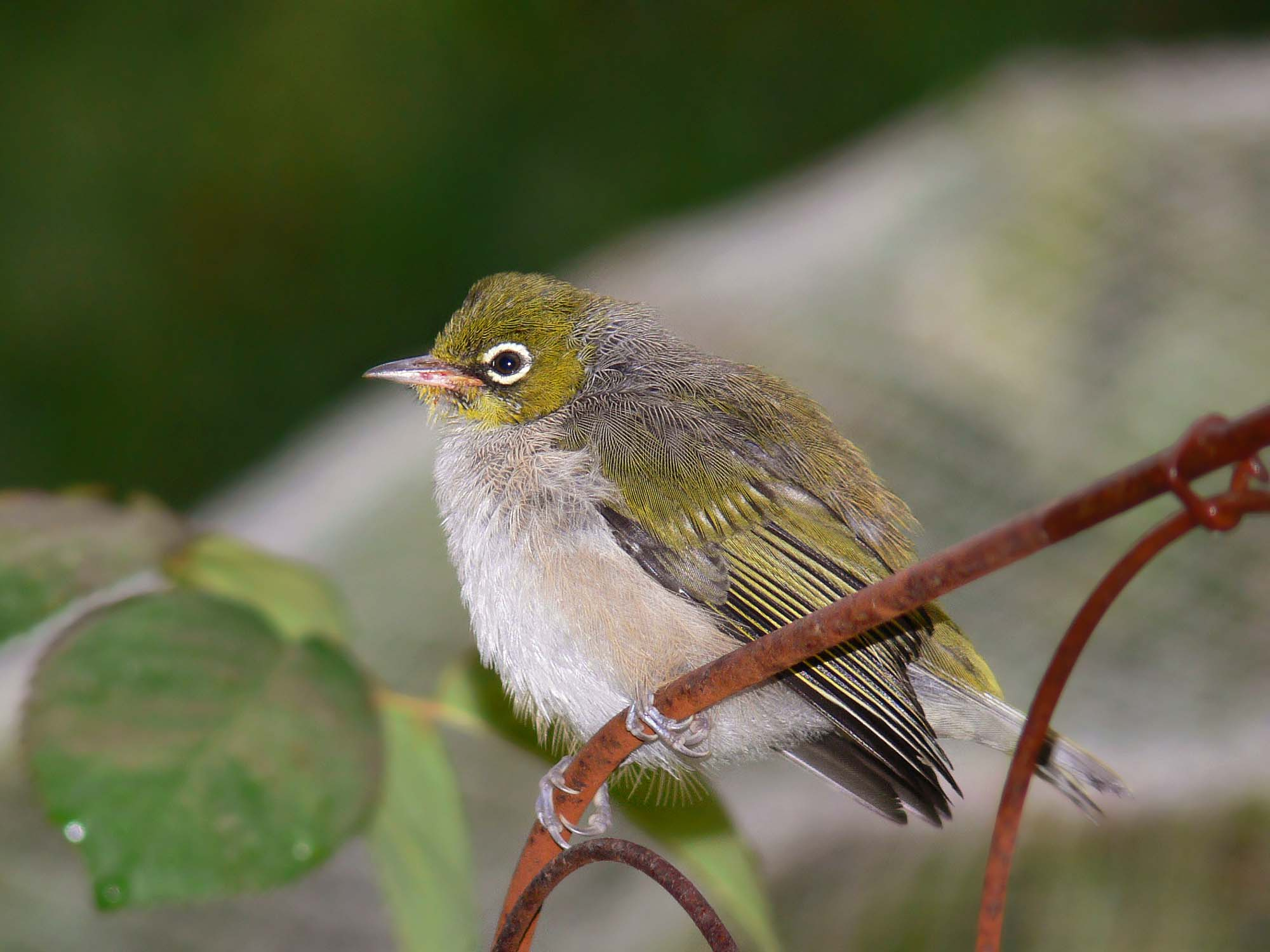
Juvenile

A small bird 11 to 13 cm in length and around 10 g in weight, it has a conspicuous ring of white feathers around its eye. There are a number of plumage variations depending on the sub-species. Generally it has olive-green wings and either a grey or olive-green back, a lighter coloured throat - yellow or grey, flanks that range from chestnut to pale buff, and an undertail that may be white or yellow. Within Australia there are seasonal migrations and the ranges of the sub-species overlap. The other islands within its range tend to host only a single sub-species each so only one plumage variant is seen.

The sperm of Zosterops lateralis exhibits a head measuring 13.01 μm, a midpiece of 52.75 μm, a flagellum extending to 56.69 μm, resulting in a total length of 69.71 μm.

== Distribution and habitat ==
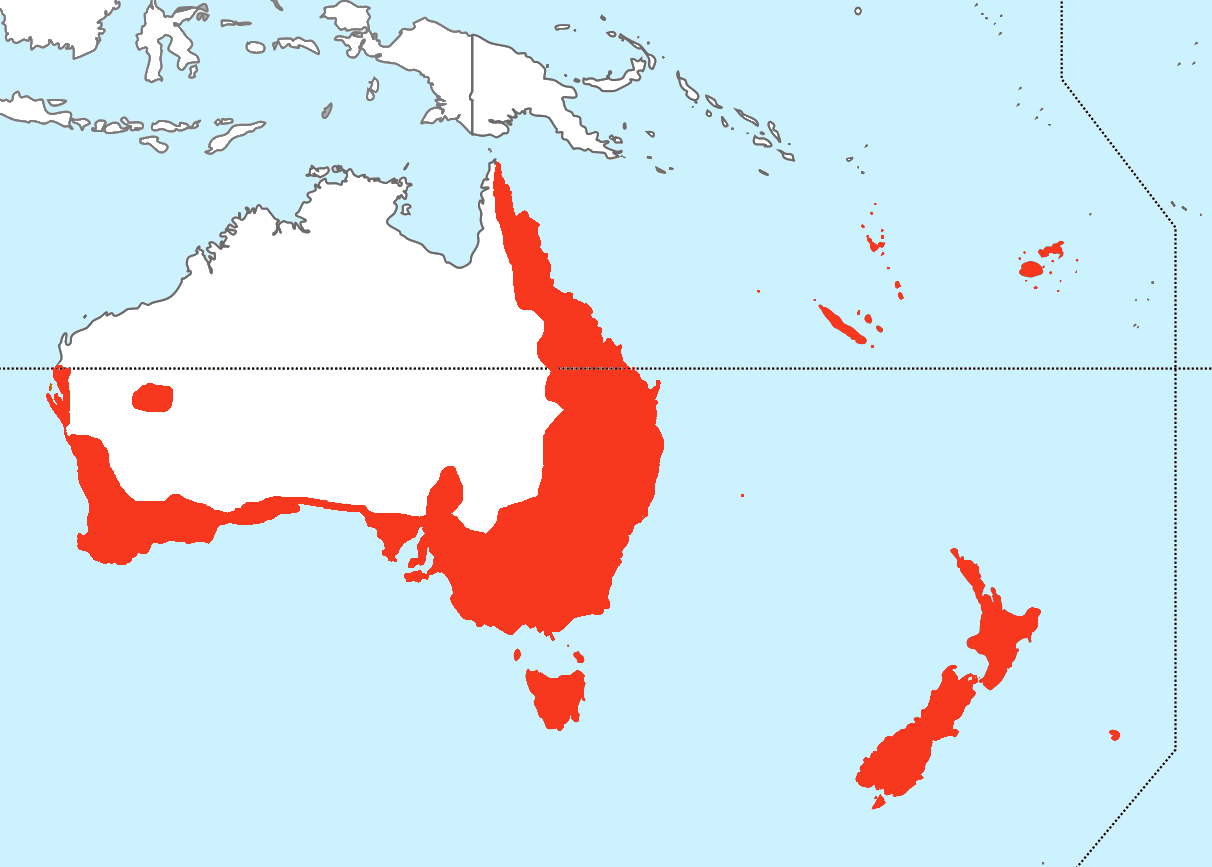
Silvereye distribution

The silvereye is native to Australia, New Zealand and the south-west Pacific islands of Lord Howe, New Caledonia, Loyalty Islands, Vanuatu, and Fiji. It is common to abundant throughout the relatively fertile south-west and south-east parts of Australia (including Tasmania and the Bass Strait islands), and through the well-watered coastal zone of tropical Queensland, including Cape York Peninsula

The silvereye is liable to be found in any vegetated area, apart from open grasslands, within its distribution range, including forest, scrub, horticultural blocks and urban gardens.

== Feeding ==
Silvereyes feed on small insects and spiders and large amounts of fruit and nectar, making them occasional pests of commercial orchards.

== Behaviour ==
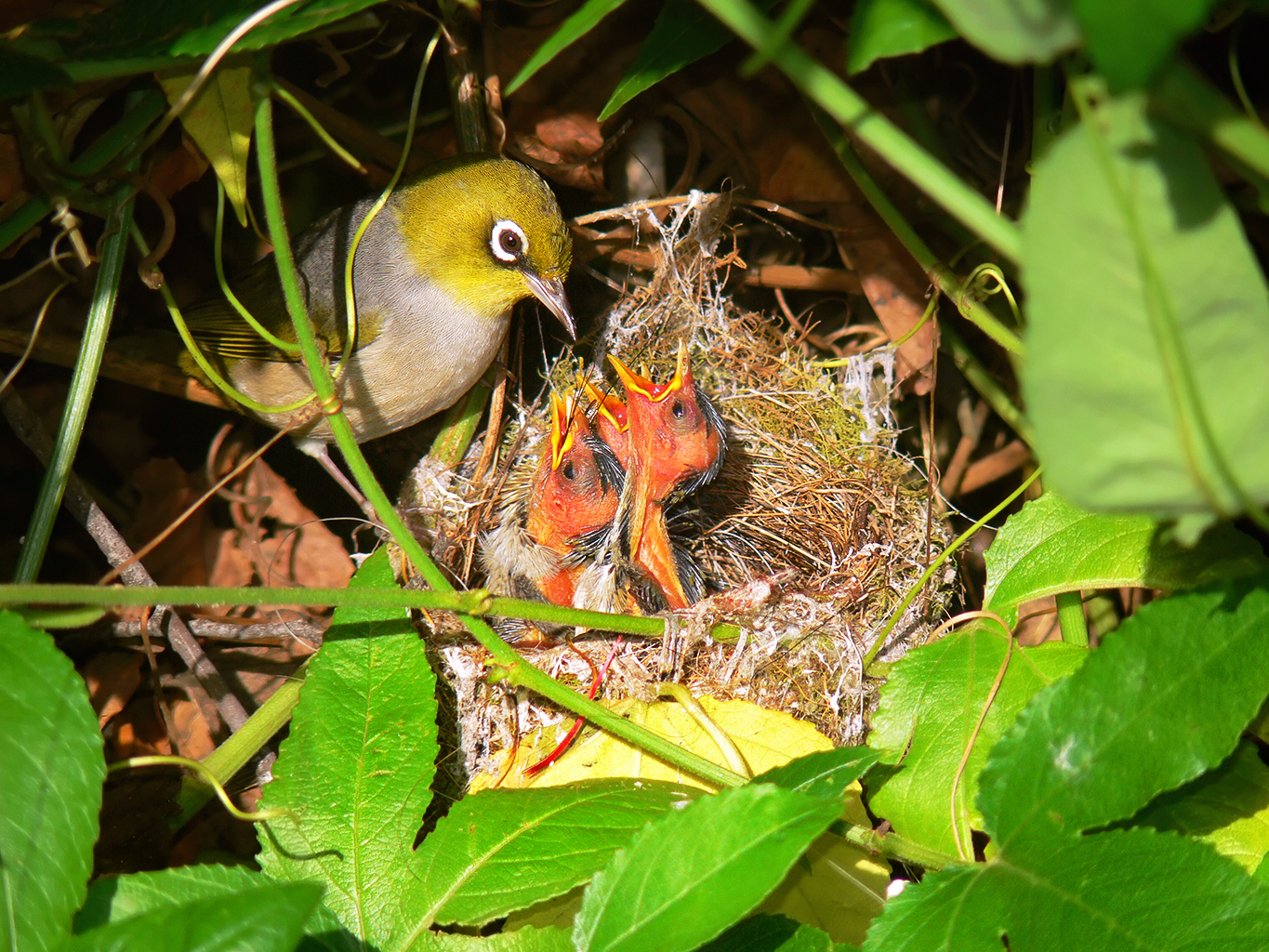
Nest and chicks

Silvereyes breed in spring and early summer (mainly between September and December), making a tiny cup of grass, moss, hair, spiderweb, and thistledown, suspended from a branch fork in the outer reaches of small trees or shrubs. They lay two to four pale blue eggs, and two (or sometimes three) broods may be raised during each breeding season. The eggs hatch after about 11 days, and the young fledge after another 10 days. The juveniles are independent at 3 weeks and able to breed at 9 months.

In late summer, silvereyes gather into flocks and many Australian birds migrate, making their way north along the coast and ranges, foraging busily during the day with much calling and quick movement through the shrubbery, then flying long distances through the night. Partial migration in the silvereye might be partly controlled by genetics, as allelic variation at the CLOCK gene is associated with migratory status.

Most of the Tasmanian population crosses the Bass Strait (an astonishing feat for 12 cm birds weighing only a few grams) and disperses into Victoria, New South Wales, and south-eastern Queensland. The populations of these areas tend to head further north; while the northernmost birds remain resident all year round. In western Australia they have been recorded moving between the mainland and offshore islands.

Silvereyes are omnivorous with a diet that includes insects, spiders, berries, fruit and nectar. In New Zealand they take fruit from native trees including kahikatea and rimu. When food is scarce in winter they will take a wide variety of foods from bird tables, ranging from sugar water through bread and cooked meats, to solid lumps of fat.

== Relationship with humans ==
Feeding on aphids

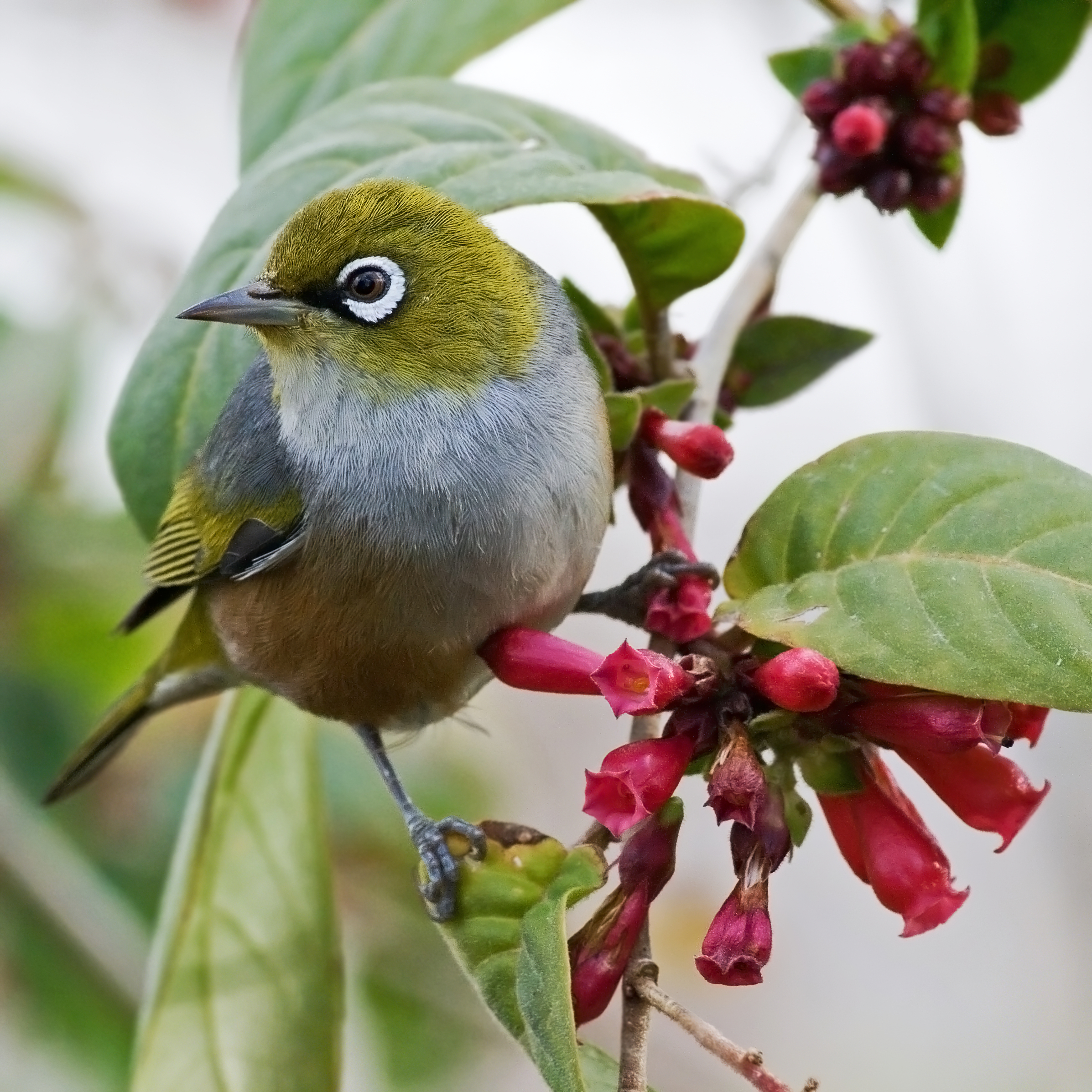
Silvereye perched on a Cestrum

=== Horticulture ===
They perform a valuable service in gardens and orchards, eating insects harmful to produce, including aphids, scale insects, and the diamondback moth. However, some orchardists, grape growers and home gardeners regard them as a serious pest particularly as, being so small, they simply ignore bird nets, popping in and out through the netting at will. They are attracted to a wide range of fruit species, including apples, citrus, feijoas, figs, grapes, pears and persimmons.

=== In literature ===
A silvereye features as the main character, Honey, in the illustrated children's books Honey and Bear, Special Days with Honey and Bear and The Honey and Bear Stories, by Ursula Dubosarsky and illustrated by Ron Brooks. In Brooks' 2010 memoir Drawn from the Heart he describes how he was inspired by a silvereye he saw in his Tasmanian garden - "those large silver rings with a fine black line around the outer edge, right round the eyes ... She's perfect, I thought. That's her! That's Honey."
