= Acacia lespedleyi =

Conservation status
- Least Concern (NCA)

Scientific classification
- Kingdom: Plantae
- Clade: Embryophytes
- Clade: Tracheophytes
- Clade: Angiosperms
- Clade: Eudicots
- Clade: Rosids
- Order: Fabales
- Family: Fabaceae
- Subfamily: Caesalpinioideae
- Clade: Mimosoid clade
- Genus: Acacia
- Species: A. lespedleyi

Binomial name
- Acacia lespedleyi P.I.Forst.

Species of legume

Acacia lespedleyi, commonly known as Les Pedley's wattle, is a species of flowering plant in the family Fabaceae and is endemic to south-eastern Queensland, Australia. It is a shrub with stringy bark, glabrous, red-tan branchlets, linear, striated phyllodes, spikes of golden yellow flowers, and linear, thinly leathery to crusty pods.

== Description ==
Acacia lespedleyi is a shrub that typically grows to a height of up to 3 m (9.8 ft) and has stringy bark that is shed in short, red-brown strips, aging to grey and glabrous, and red-tan branchlets. Its phyllodes are linear, mostly 90–150 mm (3.5–5.9 in) long, 2–4 mm (0.079–0.157 in) wide and flat with fine, longitudinal striations, the veins close together, the central veins slightly more pronounced than the rest. The phyllodes are glabrous, grey-green, often with a silvery sheen with a yellow-brown point on the end and a gland near the pulvinus. The flowers are golden yellow and borne close together in one or two spikes on a raceme up to 5 mm (0.20 in) long, the spikes 12–15 mm (0.47–0.59 in) long on peduncles 2–3 mm (0.079–0.118 in) long. Flowering occurs in September, and the pods are linear, mostly straight-sided, curved or irregularly twisted, 12–42 mm (0.47–1.65 in) long, 1–2 mm (0.039–0.079 in) wide, thinly leathery to crusty and glabrous.

== Taxonomy ==
Acacia lespedleyi was first formally described in 2020 by Paul Irwin Forster in the journal Austrobaileya from specimens he collected at Telemark, 38 km (24 mi) west of Eidsvold in 2006. The specific epithet (lespedleyi) is named for Les Pedley, "wattle specialist for many years at the Queensland Herbarium".

== Distribution and habitat ==
Les Pedley's wattle only known from the type location where there are two subpopulations 2 km (1.2 mi) apart, each occupying less the 2 km^{2} (0.77 sq mi) on the pastoral property Telemark, with the estimated number of mature individuals being less than 500. The habitat is low open forest dominated variously by Allocasuarina inophloia, Corymbia citriodora, C. trachyphloia, Eucalyptus cloeziana, E. crebra, E. exserta, E. fibrosa, and Lysicarpus angustifolius. The midstorey and understory canopies are very sparse mostly containing legumes shrubs and grasses.

== Conservation status ==
Acacia lespedleyi is listed as 'least concern' under the Queensland Government Nature Conservation Act 1992. Forster suggests that the species can be listed as 'Critically Endangered' under the criteria "B1, B2a NS BIII" of the IUCN Red List.
