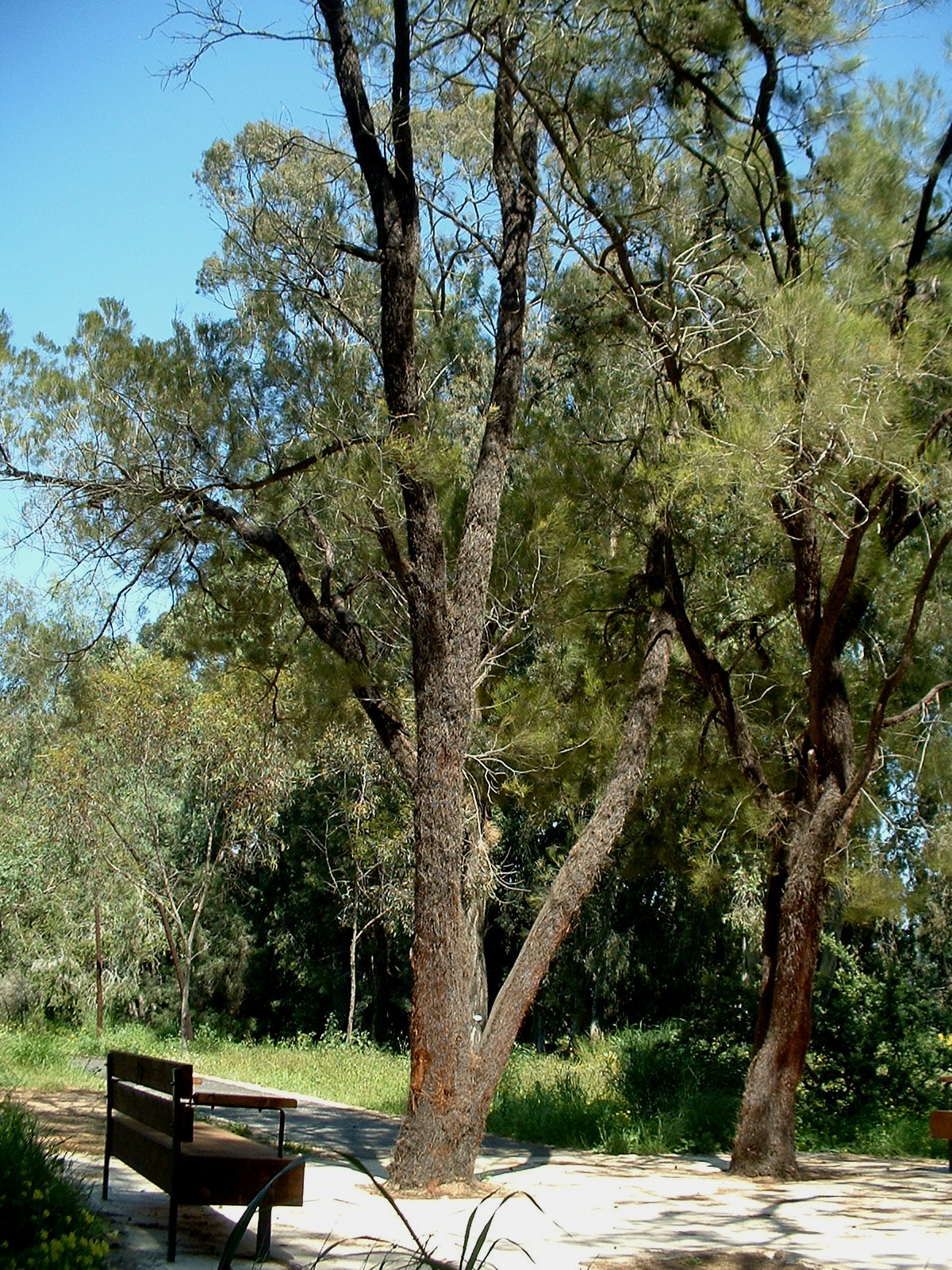

Scientific classification
- Kingdom: Plantae
- Clade: Tracheophytes
- Clade: Angiosperms
- Clade: Eudicots
- Clade: Rosids
- Order: Fagales
- Family: Casuarinaceae
- Genus: Allocasuarina
- Species: A. inophloia

Binomial name
- Allocasuarina inophloia (F.Muell. & F.M.Bailey) L.A.S.Johnson
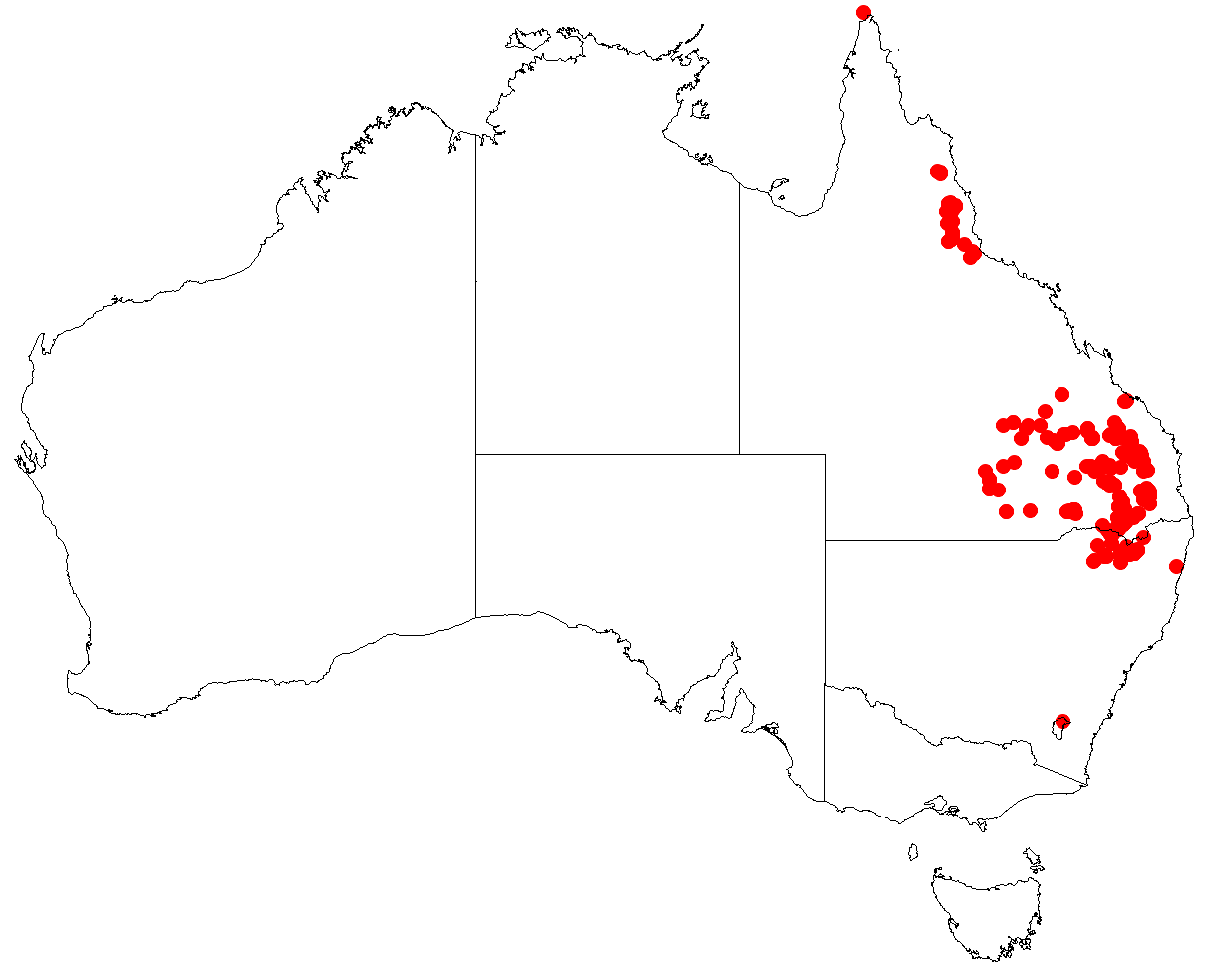
- Occurrence data from AVH

= Allocasuarina inophloia =

Species of tree

Allocasuarina inophloia, commonly known as stringybark she-oak, is a species of flowering plant in the family Casuarinaceae and is endemic to eastern Australia. It is a small dioecious tree that has finely fibrous, ribbony bark, its leaves reduced to scales in whorls of seven to nine, the mature fruiting cones 10–20 mm (0.4–0.8 in) long containing winged seeds (samaras) 5–6 mm (0.20–0.24 in) long.

== Description ==
Allocasuarina inophloia is a dioecious tree with distinctive, finely fibrous, ribbony bark that typically grows to a height of 3–10 m (9.8–32.8 ft). Its branchlets are up to 210 mm (8.3 in) long, the leaves reduced to scale-like teeth 0.3–0.5 mm (0.01–0.02 in) long, arranged in whorls of seven to nine around the branchlets. The sections of branchlet between the leaf whorls (the "articles") are 4–7 mm (0.2–0.3 in) long and 0.5–0.6 mm (0.020–0.024 in) wide. Male flowers are arranged in spikes 20–40 mm (0.8–2 in) long, in whorls of 7 to 14 per cm (per 0.4 in), the anthers 0.5–0.8 mm (0.02–0.03 in) long. The mature cones are 10–20 mm (0.4–0.8 in) long and 9–12 mm (0.4–0.5 in) in diameter containing dark brown samaras 5–6 mm (0.20–0.24 in) long.

== Taxonomy ==
This she-oak was first formally described in 1882 by Ferdinand von Mueller and Frederick Manson Bailey, who gave it the name Casuarina inophloia in The Chemist and Druggist with Australasian Supplement. In 1982, Lawrie Johnson transferred it to the new genus Allocasuarina as Allocasuarina inophloia in the Journal of the Adelaide Botanic Gardens. The specific epithet inophloia means 'sinew-bark'.

== Distribution and habitat ==
Allocasuarina inophloia grows in woodland on sandstone, ironstone or laterite ridges. It is found from near Herberton in Queensland to Torrington and Emmaville in New South Wales with a disjunct population in the Clarence River valley. In the Torrington area, it sometimes occurs in tall shrubland associated with species such as Allocasuarina brachystachya, Acacia williamsiana, Micromyrtus grandis and understorey shrubs, such as Leucopogon neoanglicus and Calytrix tetragona.

== Ecology ==
Stringybark she-oak has been recorded as a host plant for the orange mistletoe (Dendrophthoe glabrescens).

== Use in horticulture ==
The shaggy bark of this species gives it horticultural potential. It is frost hardy and able to tolerate poor soils.

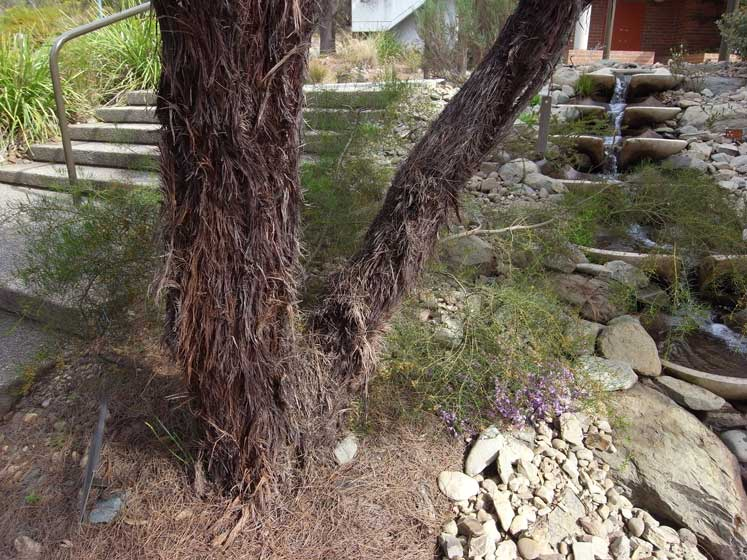
Bark on a tree in the Australian National Botanic Gardens

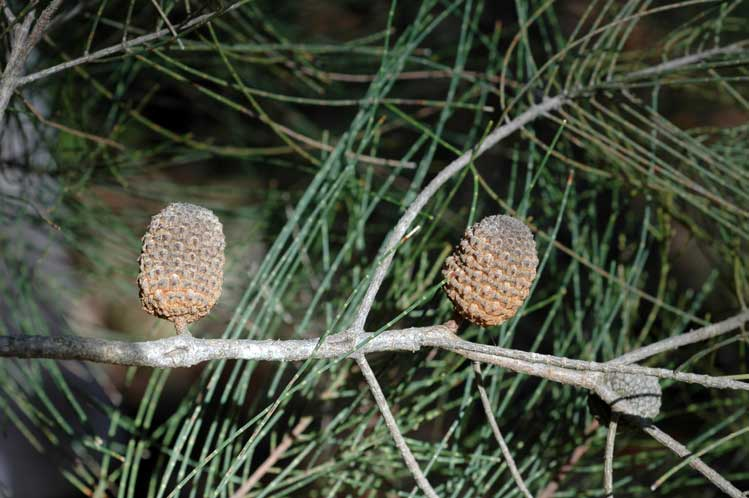
Mature cones
