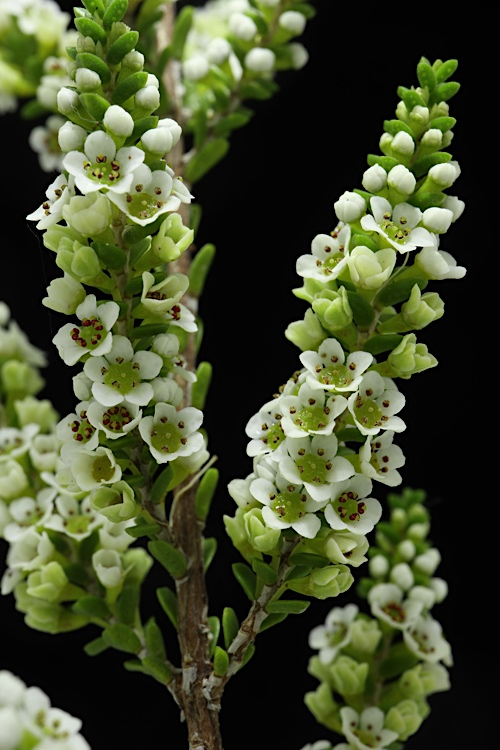
- In the Australian National Botanic Gardens

Conservation status
- Endangered (EPBC Act)

Scientific classification
- Kingdom: Plantae
- Clade: Tracheophytes
- Clade: Angiosperms
- Clade: Eudicots
- Clade: Rosids
- Order: Myrtales
- Family: Myrtaceae
- Genus: Micromyrtus
- Species: M. grandis

Binomial name
- Micromyrtus grandis J.T.Hunter

= Micromyrtus grandis =

Species of shrub

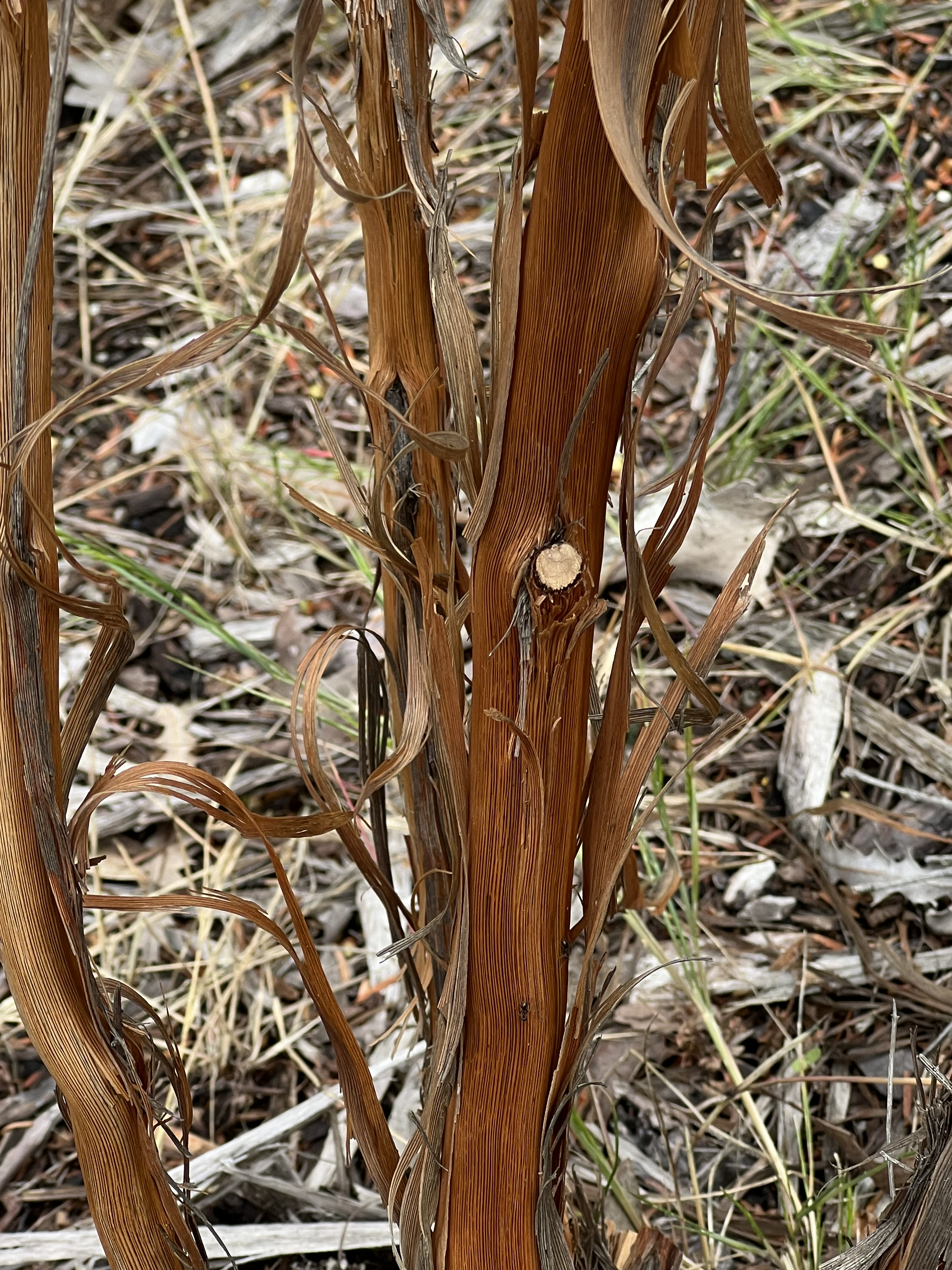
Trunk and bark

Micromyrtus grandis, commonly known as Severn River heath-myrtle, is a species of flowering plant in the myrtle family. It is an upright, monoecious shrub with egg-shaped, oval or elliptic leaves arranged in opposite pairs and white to cream-coloured flowers arranged singly in leaf axils.

== Description ==
Micromyrtus grandis grows as a monoecious shrub with an erect habit, usually reaching 1–4 m (3 ft 3 in – 13 ft 1 in) tall. The orange bark is stringy and shed in ribbons, which frequently curl. The leaves are 0.5–4.1 mm (0.020–0.161 in) long by 0.6–1.4 mm (0.024–0.055 in) wide. When held up to the light, their oil dots can be clearly seen in the leaf blade. The flowers are arranged singly in leaf axils on a peduncle 0.3–1.6 mm (0.012–0.063 in) long, with 2 bracteoles 0.7–0.9 mm (0.028–0.035 in) long at the base. The 5 petal-like sepals are 0.1–1.3 mm (0.0039–0.0512 in) wide and the 5 petals white to cream-coloured, 0.5–1.2 mm (0.020–0.047 in) long. There are 5 stamens, the filaments 0.1–0.3 mm (0.0039–0.0118 in) long and the style is 0.1–0.5 mm (0.0039–0.0197 in) long. Flowering occurs from July to September and the fruit is a brown nut 0.9–1.6 mm (0.035–0.063 in) long.

== Taxonomy and naming ==
John T. Hunter described Micromyrtus grandis in 1996, after coming across a colony of Micromyrtus on a porphyritic ridge that did not correspond to any known species. The description was first published in the journal Telopea from specimens collected in the Severn River Nature Reserve in northern New South Wales. Hunter gave it the species name grandis as it was the largest known species in the genus.

== Distribution and habitat ==
Micromyrtus grandis is found along one long ridge at an altitude of 600 to 750 m (1,970 to 2,460 ft) in the Severn River Nature Reserve and adjoining private farmland. It grows in exposed locations in heath and open woodland, associated with such species as narrow-leaved ironbark (Eucalyptus crebra), stringybark she-oak (Allocasuarina inophloia), Acacia pubifolia, Johnson's grasstree (Xanthorrhoea johnsonii), and heath species Leptospermum novae-angliae, Micromyrtus sessilis and Leucopogon neoanglicus.

== Conservation status ==
Severn River heath-myrtle is listed as "endangered" under the Australian Government Environment Protection and Biodiversity Conservation Act 1999 and the New South Wales Government Biodiversity Conservation Act 2016.

== Cultivation ==
Micromyrtus grandis has been cultivated at the Australian National Botanic Gardens in Canberra since 1998, proving hardy and easy to grow, and can be propagated by seed or cutting.
