= M. gouldii =

M. gouldii may refer to:

- Mesembriomys gouldii, the black-footed tree-rat, an arboreal rat species
- Myobatrachus gouldii, the turtle frog, a frog species found in Western Australia

== See also ==
- Gouldii (disambiguation)
