= S. gouldii =

S. gouldii may refer to:

- Scotophilus gouldii, a bat species in the genus Scotophilus
- Selenidera gouldii, the Gould's toucanet, a bird species

== See also ==
- Gouldii (disambiguation)
