= Gouldii =

Gouldii, a word referring to English naturalist John Gould (1804–1881), may refer to:

- A. gouldii
  - Achoerodus gouldii, the Western blue groper, a fish species in the genus Achoerodus
- E. gouldii
  - Elaps gouldii, a snake species in the genus Elaps
- R. gouldii
  - Ristantia gouldii, a plant species in the genus Ristantia

== Subspecies ==
- Zosterops lateralis gouldii, the grey-breasted white-eye or the western silvereye, a bird subspecies found in Western Australia and South Australia

== See also ==
- Gould (name)
- gouldiae
- gouldi (disambiguation)
