= Kania (plant) =

Scientific classification
- Kingdom: Plantae
- Clade: Tracheophytes
- Clade: Angiosperms
- Clade: Eudicots
- Clade: Rosids
- Order: Myrtales
- Family: Myrtaceae
- Subfamily: Myrtoideae
- Tribe: Kanieae
- Genus: Kania; Schltr.

Genus of shrubs

Kania is a genus of evergreen shrubs in the myrtle family Myrtaceae described as a genus in 1914. The entire genus is native to New Guinea and the Philippines.

Species

1. Kania eugenioides Schltr. - New Guinea
2. Kania hirsutula (F.Muell.) A.J.Scott - New Guinea
3. Kania microphylla (Quisumb. & Merr.) Peter G.Wilson - Philippines
4. Kania nettotensis A.J.Scott - W New Guinea
5. Kania platyphylla A.J.Scott - W New Guinea
6. Kania urdanetensis (Elmer) Peter G.Wilson - Mindanao
