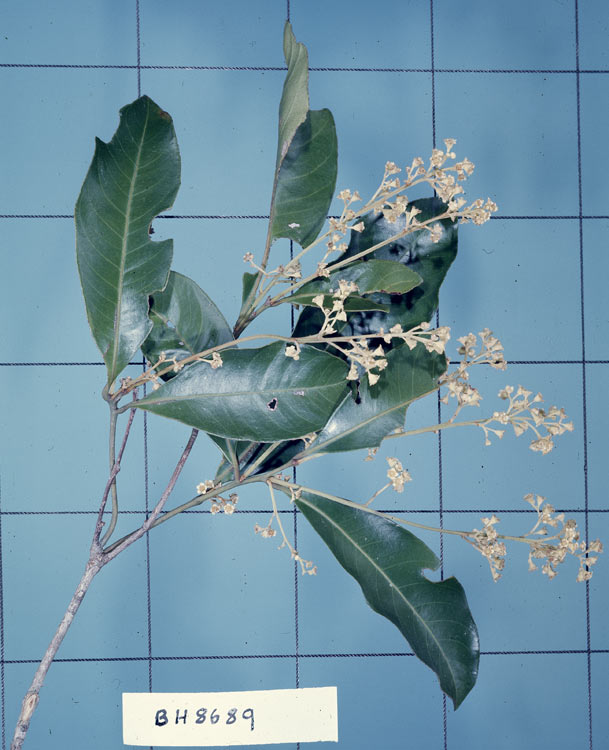

Conservation status
- Critically Endangered (NCA)

Scientific classification
- Kingdom: Plantae
- Clade: Tracheophytes
- Clade: Angiosperms
- Clade: Eudicots
- Clade: Rosids
- Order: Myrtales
- Family: Myrtaceae
- Subfamily: Myrtoideae
- Tribe: Kanieae
- Genus: Mitrantia; Peter G.Wilson & B.Hyland
- Species: M. bilocularis

Binomial name
- Mitrantia bilocularis Peter G.Wilson & B.Hyland

= Mitrantia =

Genus of flowering plants

Mitrantia is a genus of flowering plant in family Myrtaceae described in 1988. It contains one known species, Mitrantia bilocularis, a tree which is endemic to a small patch of rainforest in the Daintree National Park north of Mossman in North Queensland .

== Description ==
Is a tree which grows to at least 25 metres in height and 80 centimetres in diameter at breast height. It has been recorded to flower in March and fruit in September. It can be distinguished by the 2-locular, conical, exserted capsule fruit, which is dry and indehiscent, as well as the ovoid seeds. It is monoecious.

It can only be found in a timber reserve, in and around Whyanbeel at elevations of approximately 100 to 250 metres.

== Conservation status ==
It has been assessed as Critically Endangered by the Queensland Government under the Nature Conservation Act 1992.
