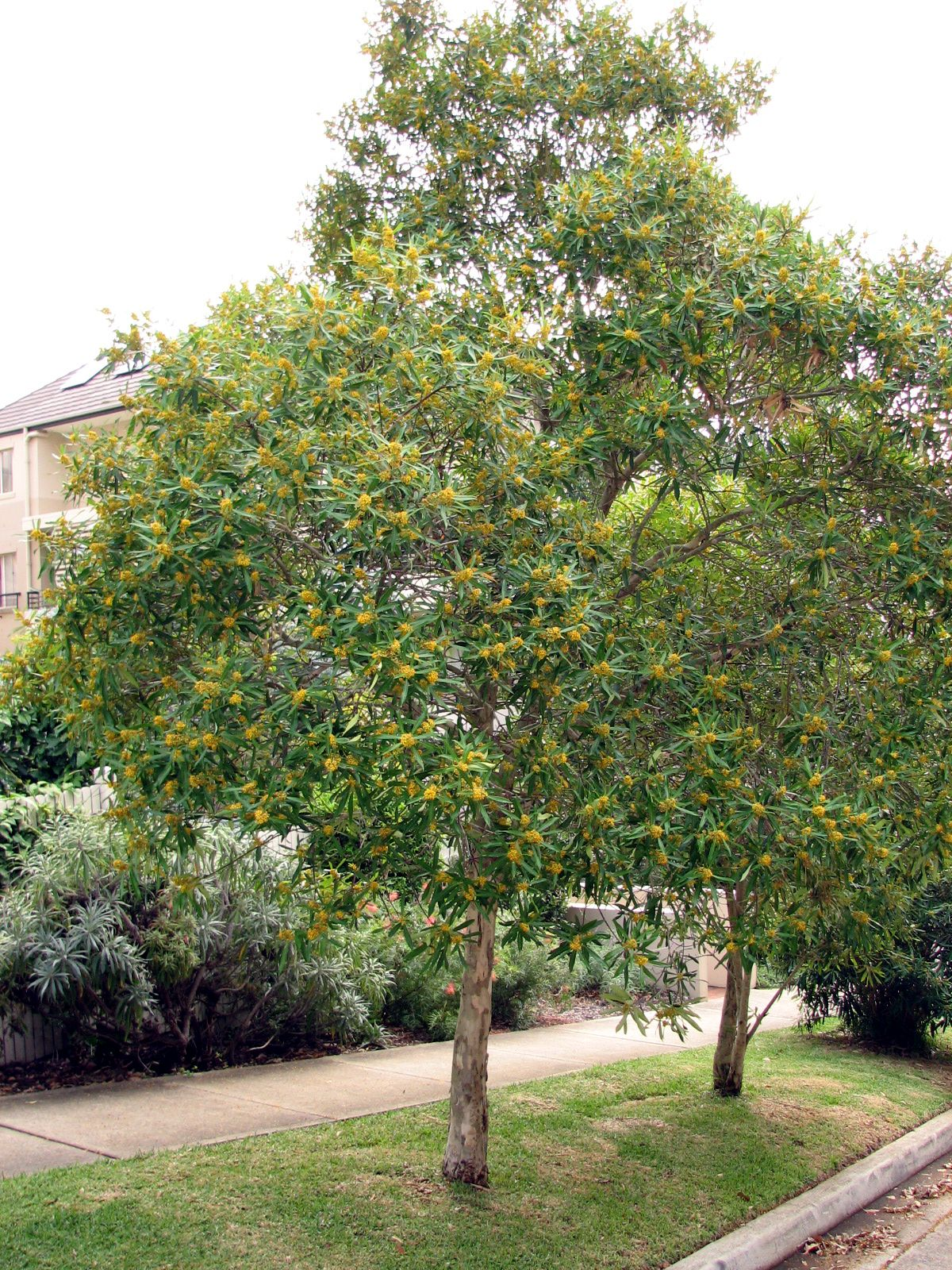
- Water gum tree (Tristaniopsis laurina) — as street tree in Sydney

Scientific classification
- Kingdom: Plantae
- Clade: Tracheophytes
- Clade: Angiosperms
- Clade: Eudicots
- Clade: Rosids
- Order: Myrtales
- Family: Myrtaceae
- Subfamily: Myrtoideae
- Tribe: Kanieae

= Kanieae =

Tribe of flowering plants

Kanieae is a tribe in the plant family Myrtaceae from Oceania and south-East Asia with a main diversity center in Australia.

== Genera ==
- Barongia (Australia)
- Sphaerantia (Australia)
- Ristantia (Australia)
- Mitrantia (Australia)
- Basisperma
- Tristaniopsis
- Lysicarpus (Australia)
- Kania
