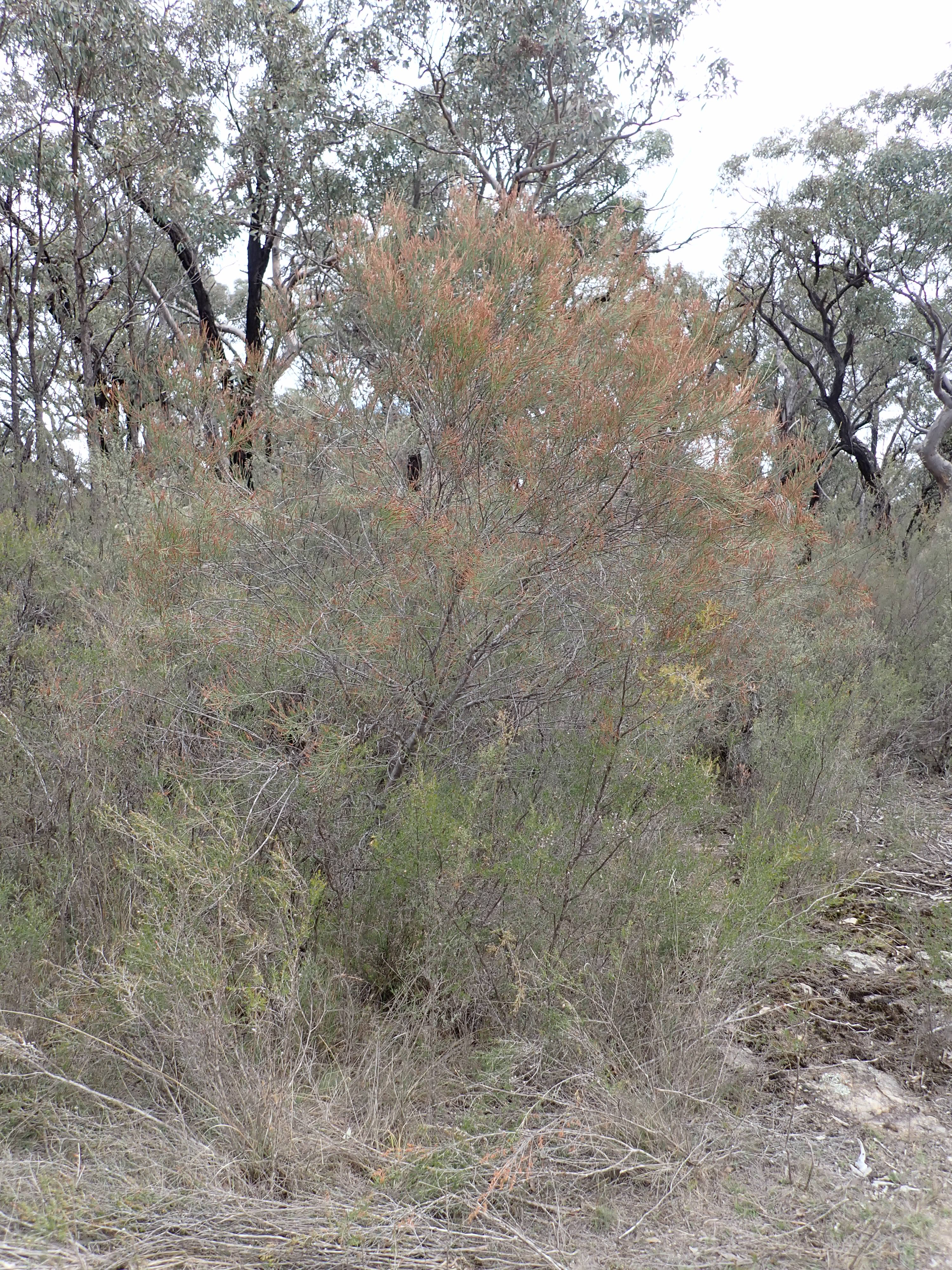
- In Kings Plains National Park

Scientific classification
- Kingdom: Plantae
- Clade: Tracheophytes
- Clade: Angiosperms
- Clade: Eudicots
- Clade: Rosids
- Order: Fagales
- Family: Casuarinaceae
- Genus: Allocasuarina
- Species: A. brachystachya

Binomial name
- Allocasuarina brachystachya L.A.S.Johnson
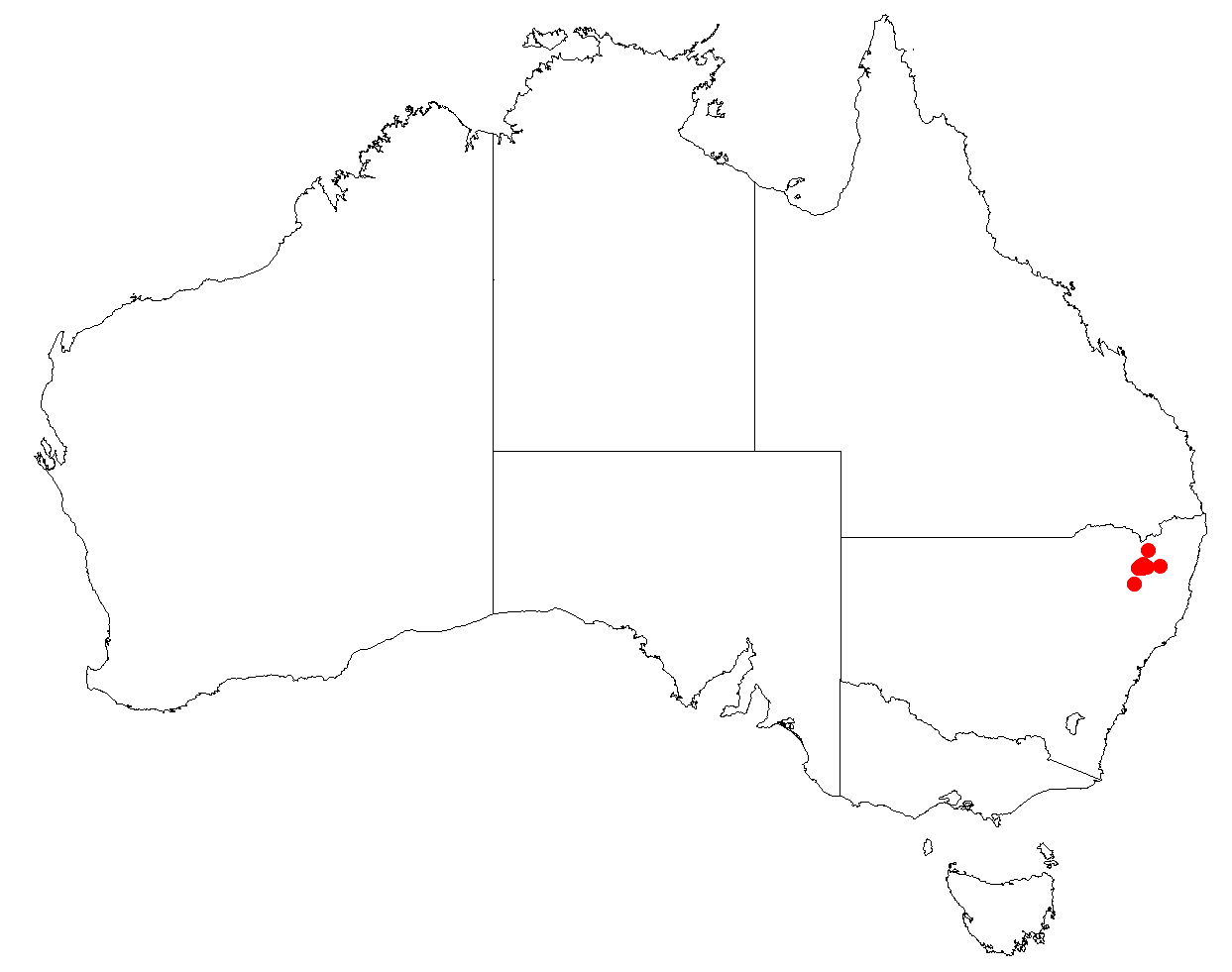
- Occurrence data from AVH

= Allocasuarina brachystachya =

Species of flowering plant

Allocasuarina brachystachya is a species of flowering plant in the family Casuarinaceae and is endemic to the Northern Tablelands of New South Wales. It is an open, usually monoecious shrub that has branchlets up to 70 mm (2.8 in) long, the leaves reduced to scales in whorls of 5 to 7, the fruiting cones 7–14 mm (0.28–0.55 in) long containing winged seeds (samaras) 2.5–4 mm (0.098–0.157 in) long.

== Description ==
Allocasuarina brachystachya is an open, spreading, usually monoecious shrub that typically grows to a height of up to about 3 m (9.8 ft). Its branchlets are more or less erect, up to 70 mm (2.8 in) long, the leaves reduced to erect, scale-like teeth 0.2–0.5 mm (0.0079–0.0197 in) long, arranged in whorls of five to seven around the branchlets. The sections of branchlet between the leaf whorls (the "articles") are 2–5 mm (0.079–0.197 in) long and 0.4–0.7 mm (0.016–0.028 in) wide. Male flowers are arranged in head-like spikes 5–17 mm (0.20–0.67 in) long, the anthers 0.3–0.6 mm (0.012–0.024 in) long. Female cones are covered with fine, white or dark yellowish hairs when young, and are sessile or on a peduncle up to 5 mm (0.20 in) long. Mature cones are 7–14 mm (0.28–0.55 in) long and 5–8 mm (0.20–0.31 in) in diameter, the samaras 2.5–4.0 mm (0.098–0.157 in) long.

This casuarina is similar to Allocasuarina paludosa.

== Taxonomy ==
Allocasuarina brachystachya was first formally described in 1989 by Lawrie Johnson in the Flora of Australia from specimens collected by Karen Wilson near Tingha in 1980.

The specific epithet, (brachystachya) means "short spike", referring to the male spikes.

== Distribution and habitat ==
This sheoak grows in low open woodland between Emmaville, Guyra and Moredun, on the western edge of the Northern Tablelands of New South Wales.

== Gallery ==
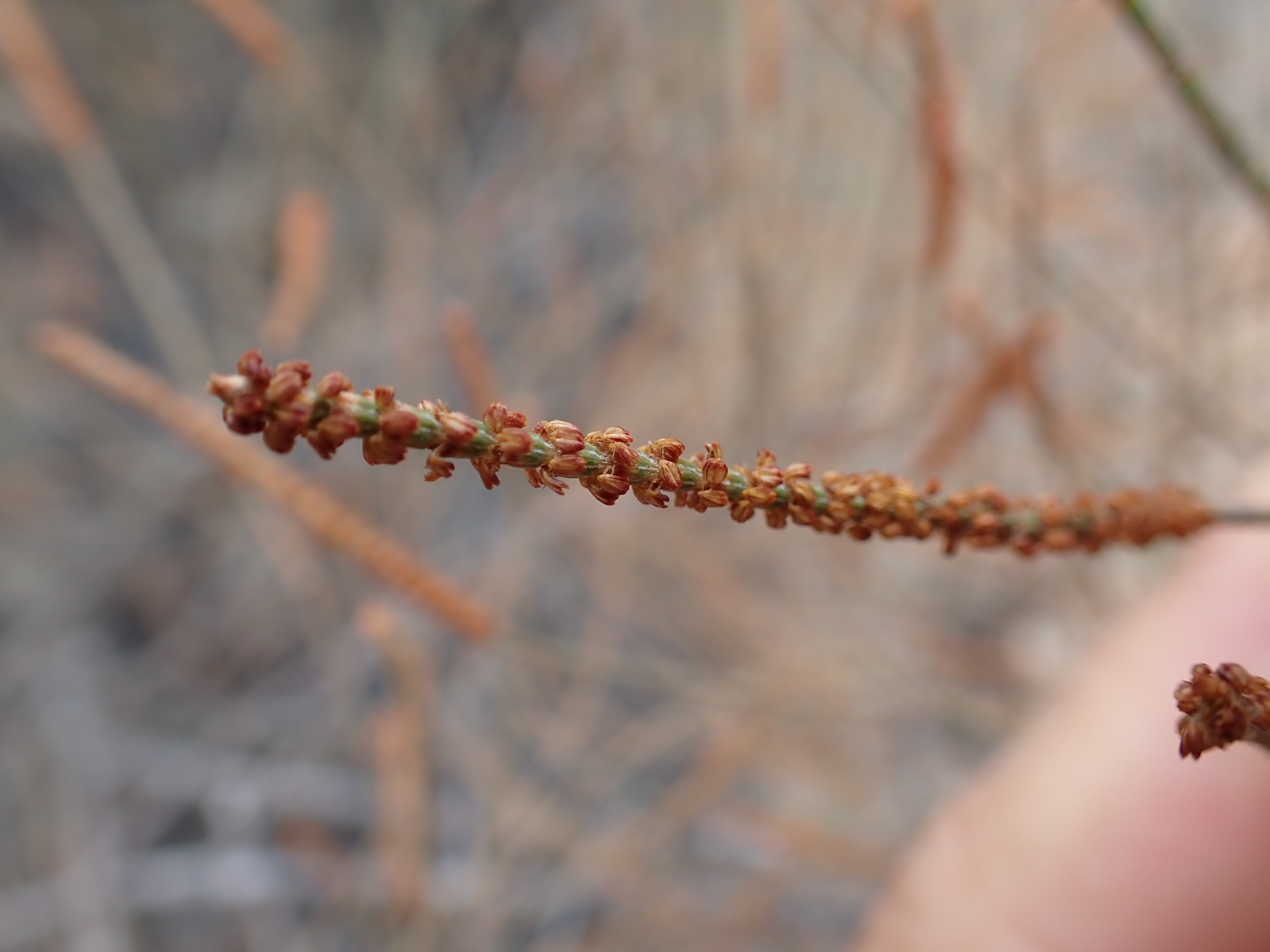
Male spike

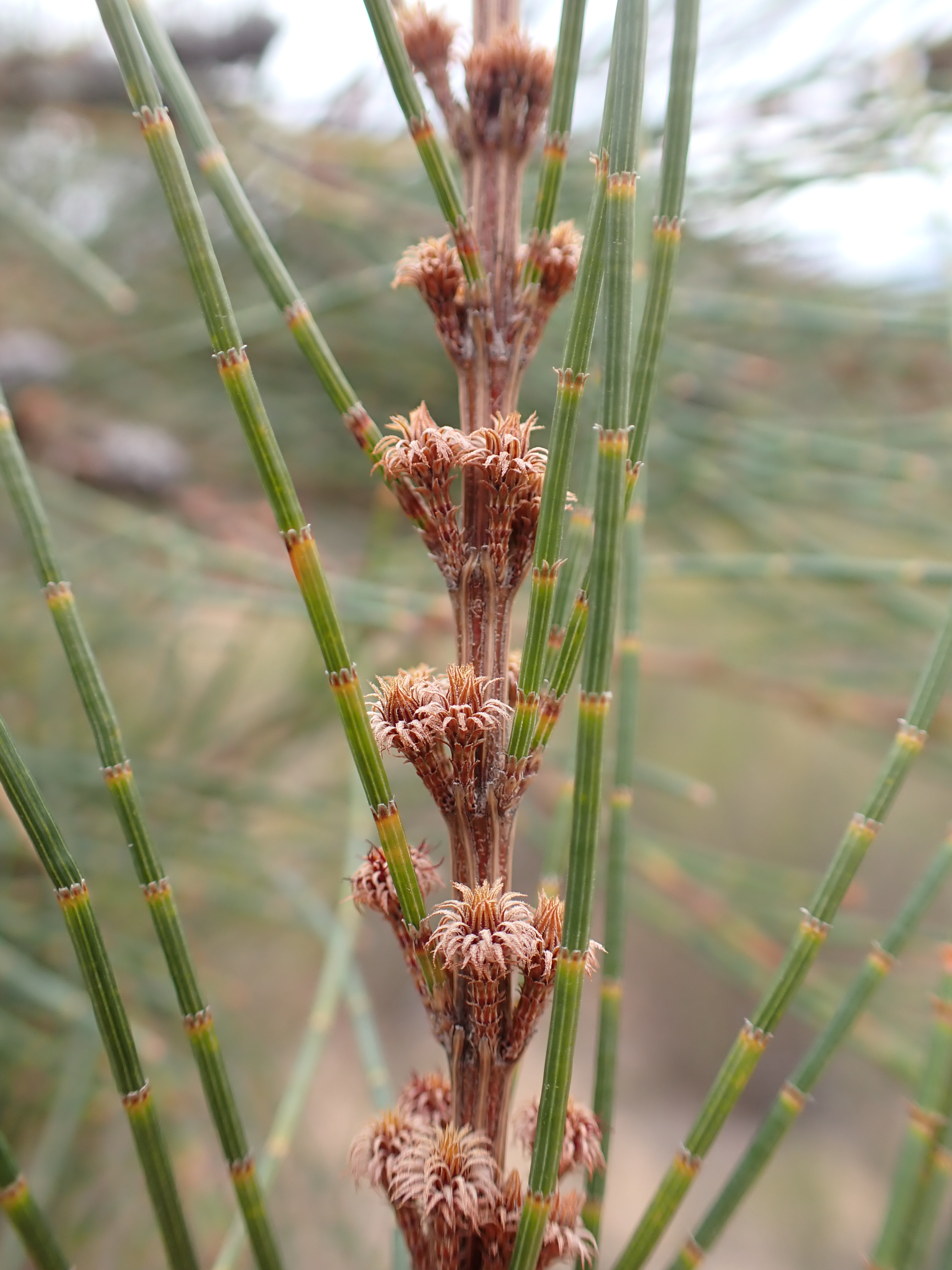
New growth female plant

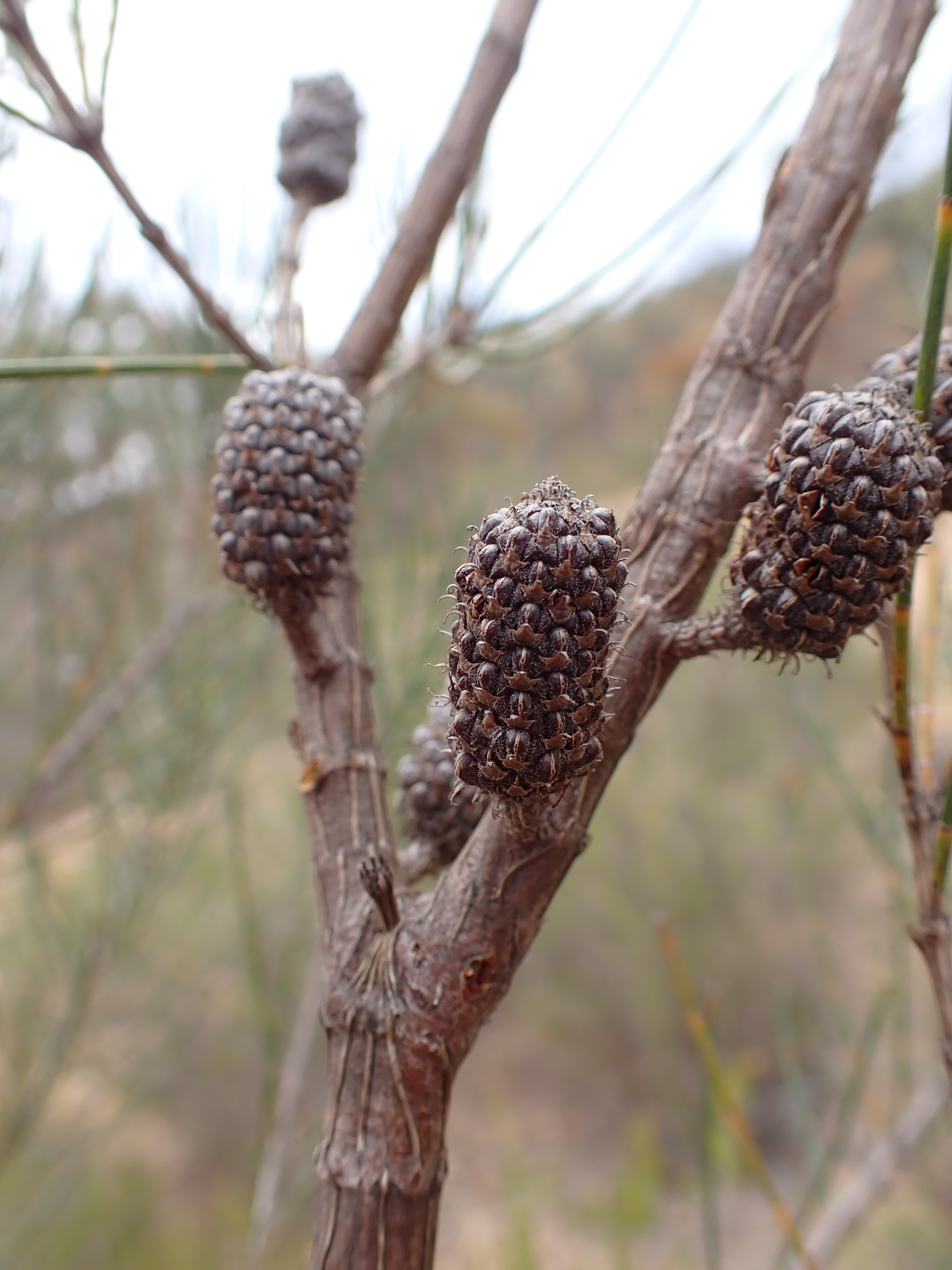
Mature cones
