= Sphaerantia =

Scientific classification
- Kingdom: Plantae
- Clade: Tracheophytes
- Clade: Angiosperms
- Clade: Eudicots
- Clade: Rosids
- Order: Myrtales
- Family: Myrtaceae
- Subfamily: Myrtoideae
- Tribe: Kanieae
- Genus: Sphaerantia; Peter G.Wilson & B.Hyland

Genus of flowering plants

Sphaerantia is a group of flowering plants in the family Myrtaceae, described as a genus in 1988. The entire genus is endemic to the northern part of the State of Queensland in Australia.

Species

- Sphaerantia chartacea Peter G.Wilson & B.Hyland
- Sphaerantia discolor Peter G.Wilson & B.Hyland
