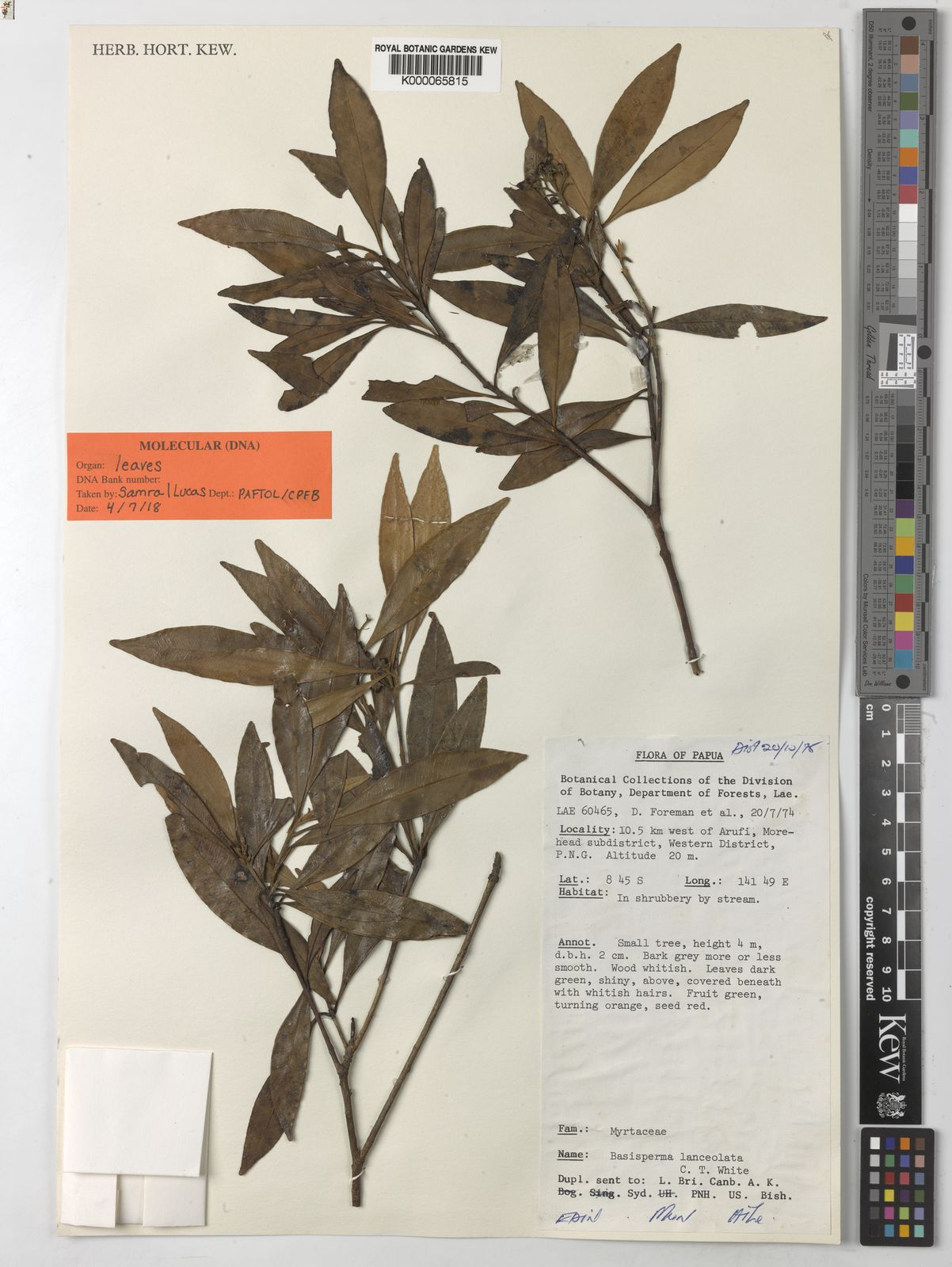

Conservation status
- Endangered (IUCN 3.1)

Scientific classification
- Kingdom: Plantae
- Clade: Tracheophytes
- Clade: Angiosperms
- Clade: Eudicots
- Clade: Rosids
- Order: Myrtales
- Family: Myrtaceae
- Subfamily: Myrtoideae
- Tribe: Kanieae
- Genus: Basisperma; C.T.White
- Species: B. lanceolata

Binomial name
- Basisperma lanceolata C.T.White

= Basisperma =

Genus of flowering plants

Basisperma is a genus of flowering plants in the myrtle family, Myrtaceae first described as a genus in 1942. There is only one known species, Basisperma lanceolata, endemic to Papua New Guinea.
