= Barongia =

Scientific classification
- Kingdom: Plantae
- Clade: Tracheophytes
- Clade: Angiosperms
- Clade: Eudicots
- Clade: Rosids
- Order: Myrtales
- Family: Myrtaceae
- Subfamily: Myrtoideae
- Tribe: Kanieae
- Genus: Barongia; P.G.Wilson & B.Hyland
- Species: B. lophandra

Binomial name
- Barongia lophandra Peter Gordon Wilson & B.Hyland

Genus of flowering plants

Barongia is a genus of flowering plants in the myrtle family, Myrtaceae first described as a genus in 1988. It contains only one known species, Barongia lophandra, endemic to the Cook region of Queensland, Australia.
