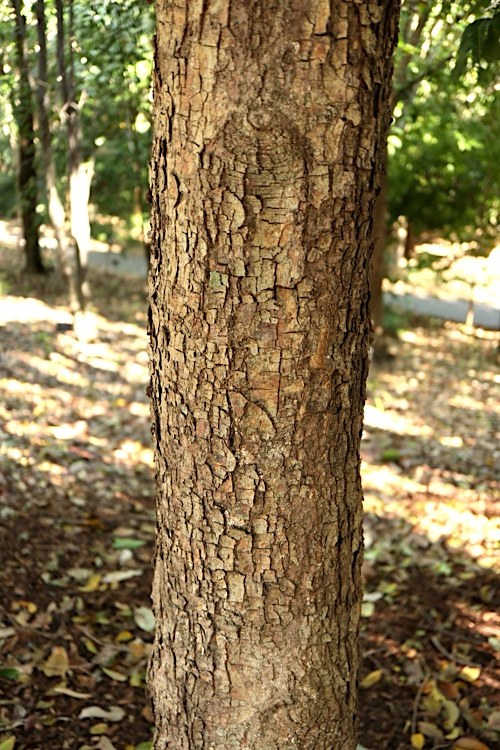

Conservation status
- Critically Endangered (NCA)

Scientific classification
- Kingdom: Plantae
- Clade: Tracheophytes
- Clade: Angiosperms
- Clade: Eudicots
- Clade: Rosids
- Order: Myrtales
- Family: Myrtaceae
- Genus: Ristantia
- Species: R. waterhousei

Binomial name
- Ristantia waterhousei Peter G.Wilson

= Ristantia waterhousei =

Species of flowering plant

Ristantia waterhousei is a rare species of plants in the clove and eucalyptus family Myrtaceae, native to a small area of Queensland, Australia. It is a tree to more than 20 m (66 ft) in height and 65 cm (26 in) diameter, which inhabits rainforest on Mount Dryander, about 20 km (12 mi) northwest of Airlie Beach. It was first described in 1988, the third of three described species in the genus.

== Conservation ==
This species is listed as critically endangered under the Queensland Government's Nature Conservation Act. As of 2 May 2025, it has not been assessed by the International Union for Conservation of Nature.
