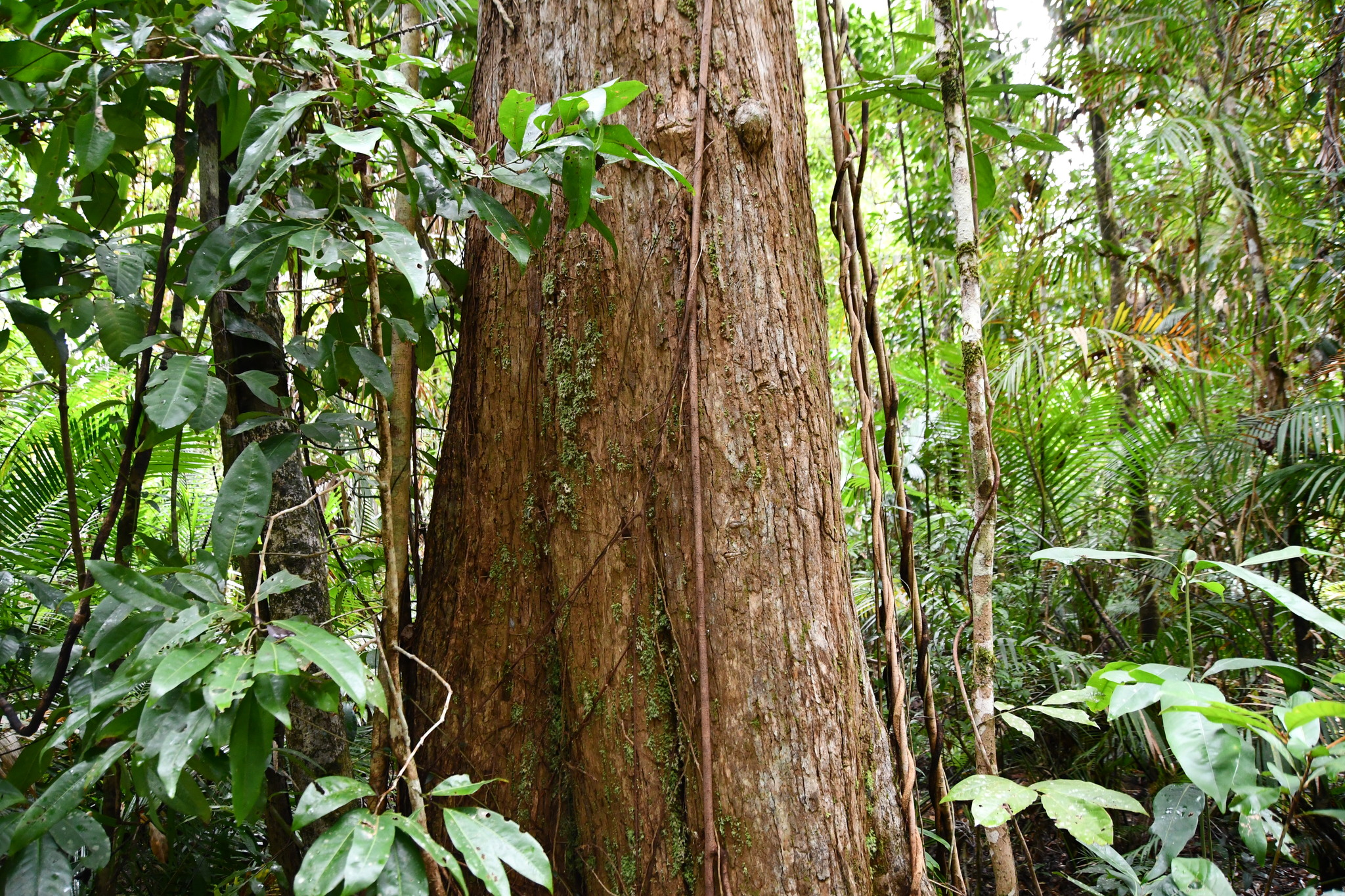
- Tree at Cape Tribulation

Conservation status
- Critically Endangered (NCA)

Scientific classification
- Kingdom: Plantae
- Clade: Tracheophytes
- Clade: Angiosperms
- Clade: Eudicots
- Clade: Rosids
- Order: Myrtales
- Family: Myrtaceae
- Genus: Ristantia
- Species: R. pachysperma

Binomial name
- Ristantia pachysperma (F.Muell. & F.M.Bailey) Peter G.Wilson & J.T.Waterh.
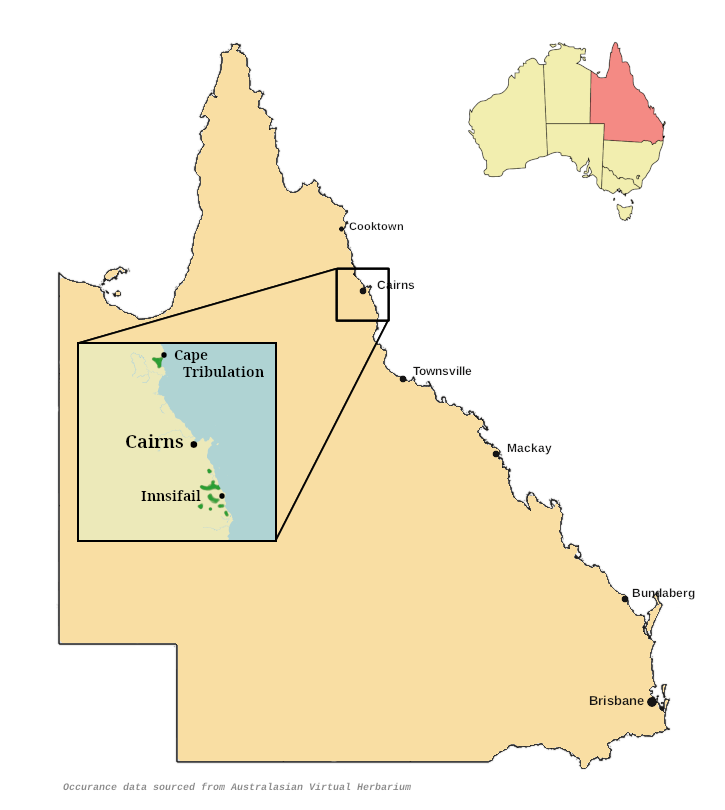

Synonyms
- Metrosideros pachysperma (F.Muell. & F.M.Bailey) F.Muell.; Tristania pachysperma (F.Muell. & F.M.Bailey) W.D.Francis; Xanthostemon pachyspermus F.Muell. & F.M.Bailey; Tristania odorata C.T.White & W.D.Francis

= Ristantia pachysperma =

Yellow penda

Species of flowering plant

Ristantia pachysperma, commonly known as yellow penda, is a species of plant in the clove and eucalyptus family Myrtaceae. It is native to the Wet Tropics bioregion of Queensland, Australia, and is listed as critically endangered. It was first described in 1982.

== Description ==
It is a large rainforest tree reaching up to 35 m (115 ft) in height, with brown furrowed bark and (sometimes) buttresses. The leaves are simple, arranged alternately or in whorls on the twigs, and are obovate in shape. They can grow up to 21 cm (8 in) long and are attached to the twig by a petiole (leaf stem) up to 12 mm (0.5 in) long.

The inflorescences are produced from the leaf axils and are about 10 cm (4 in) long. They carry numerous quite small flowers, each with five white petals about 3 mm (0.12 in) long. Stamens number about 100 and are arranged in groups opposite the petals, each group with up to four sterile stamens and 15–20 fertile ones.

The woody fruit is about 18 mm (0.7 in) diameter, with three locules or segments, and they usually contain one or two seeds per fruit.

== Distribution and habitat ==
It occurs in two main populations to the north and south of Cairns, one near Cape Tribulation and another broader population from about Fishery Falls to Mourilyan. It grows in lowland rainforest at altitudes up to 100 m (330 ft), often close to swamps.

== Taxonomy ==
This species was first described in 1886 as Xanthostemon pachyspermus by botanists Ferdinand von Mueller and Frederick Manson Bailey. It was described again in 1920 by Cyril Tenison White and William Douglas Francis, who, unaware that they were dealing with the same plant as Mueller and Bailey's earlier work, gave it the combination Tristania odorata. In 1951, having realised the error, Francis published a new combination, keeping the earlier species epithet pachyspermus but placing it in the genus Tristania. By 1980, botanist Peter Gordon Wilson had recognised that Tristania contained a number of species that were not closely related, and he published a full revision of the genus in 1982, resulting in the creation of the new genus Ristantia and the transfer of this species to it.

=== Etymology ===
The name Ristantia is an anagram of Tristania.The species epithet is derived from the Ancient Greek words păkhŭ́s, thick, and spérma, seed, as a reference to the hard woody capsules.

== Conservation ==
This species is listed as critically endangered under the Queensland Government's Nature Conservation Act. As of 13 May 2026, it has not been assessed by the International Union for Conservation of Nature.
