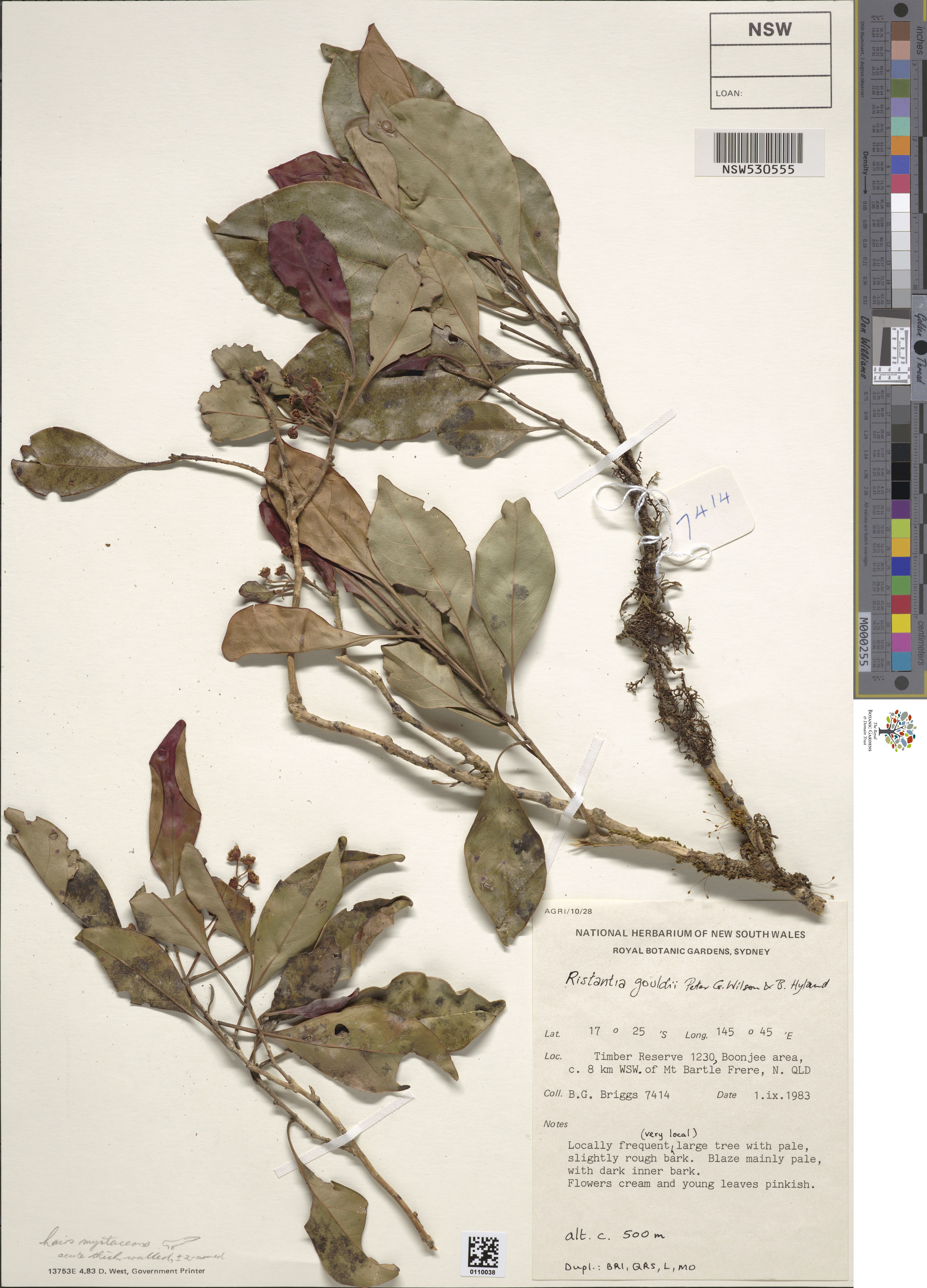
- Herbarium specimen

Conservation status
- Vulnerable (NCA)

Scientific classification
- Kingdom: Plantae
- Clade: Tracheophytes
- Clade: Angiosperms
- Clade: Eudicots
- Clade: Rosids
- Order: Myrtales
- Family: Myrtaceae
- Genus: Ristantia
- Species: R. gouldii

Binomial name
- Ristantia gouldii Peter G.Wilson

= Ristantia gouldii =

Species of flowering plant

Ristantia gouldii is a rare species of plants in the clove and eucalyptus family Myrtaceae, native to a small area of the Wet Tropics bioregion of Queensland, Australia. It is a tree to at least 30 m (98 ft) in height and 1 m (3 ft 3 in) diameter, which inhabits rainforest on the eastern margins of the Atherton Tableland. It was first described in 1988, the second of three described species in the genus.

== Conservation ==
This species is listed as vulnerable under the Queensland Government's Nature Conservation Act. As of 2 May 2025, it has not been assessed by the International Union for Conservation of Nature.
