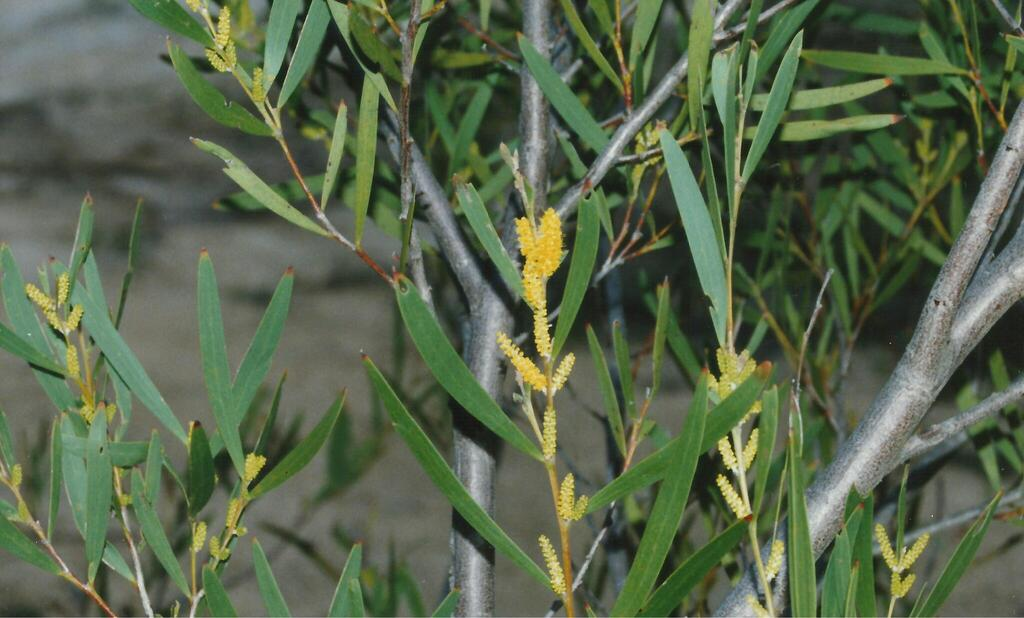
- Near Emmaville

Scientific classification
- Kingdom: Plantae
- Clade: Embryophytes
- Clade: Tracheophytes
- Clade: Spermatophytes
- Clade: Angiosperms
- Clade: Eudicots
- Clade: Rosids
- Order: Fabales
- Family: Fabaceae
- Subfamily: Caesalpinioideae
- Clade: Mimosoid clade
- Genus: Acacia
- Species: A. williamsiana

Binomial name
- Acacia williamsiana J.T.Hunter
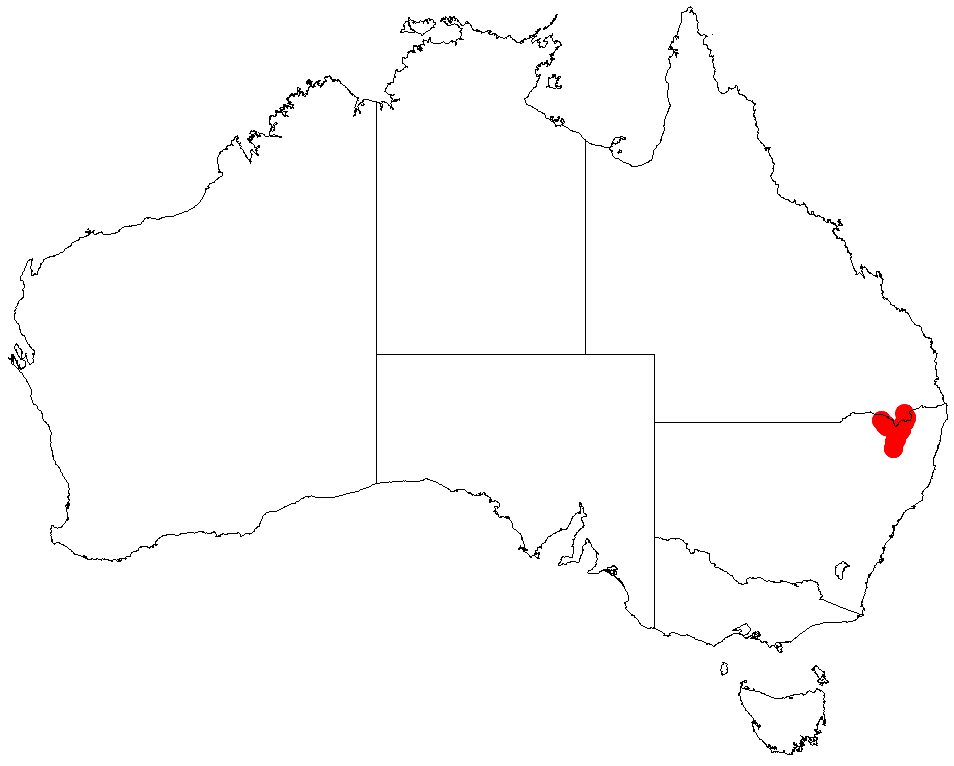
- Occurrence data from AVH

= Acacia williamsiana =

Species of legume

Acacia williamsiana is a tree or shrub belonging to the genus Acacia and the subgenus Juliflorae that is native to eastern Australia.

== Description ==
The tall shrub or tall tree with a spreading to erect habit and typically grows to a height of 2 to 8 m (6 ft 7 in to 26 ft 3 in) and has angular and glabrous branchlets that can be covered in a fine white powdery coating. Like most species of Acacia it has phyllodes rather than true leaves. On juvenile plants the phyllodes have a broadly elliptic to obovate shape with a length of 1.3 to 7.5 cm (0.51 to 2.95 in) and a width of 13 to 25 mm (0.51 to 0.98 in). As the plant matures the pale-green to grey green phyllodes have a more oblanceolate, narrowly elliptic or linear shape and are 5 to 12 cm (2.0 to 4.7 in) in length and 4 to 11 mm (0.16 to 0.43 in). The generally glabrous phyllodes have many longitudinal nerves that are closely parallel with three to five nerves that are more prominent than the others. It flowers between September and December and produces simple inflorescences form cylindrical flower-spikes with pale yellow flowers. After flowering linear to moniliform seed pods form that are 3.5 to 9 cm (1.4 to 3.5 in) in length and 2 to 4 mm (0.079 to 0.157 in) wide that are wrinkled and curved. The black to dark brown seeds inside are arranged longitudinally and have an ellipsoid shape.

== Taxonomy ==
The specific epithet honours John Beaumont Williams who was a botanist and teacher who had worked at New England University in Armidale and first noticed the distinctiveness of this species.

== Distribution ==
It is endemic to south eastern Queensland and north eastern New South Wales and has a disjunct distribution. In New South Wales it is found in a 100 km (62 mi) radius centred around Glen Innes out to around Ashford in the west and to around Torrington in the north and in areas around Ballandean in southern Queensland. It is often situated around granite outcrops as a part of woodland and low shrubland communities.

== See also ==
- List of Acacia species
