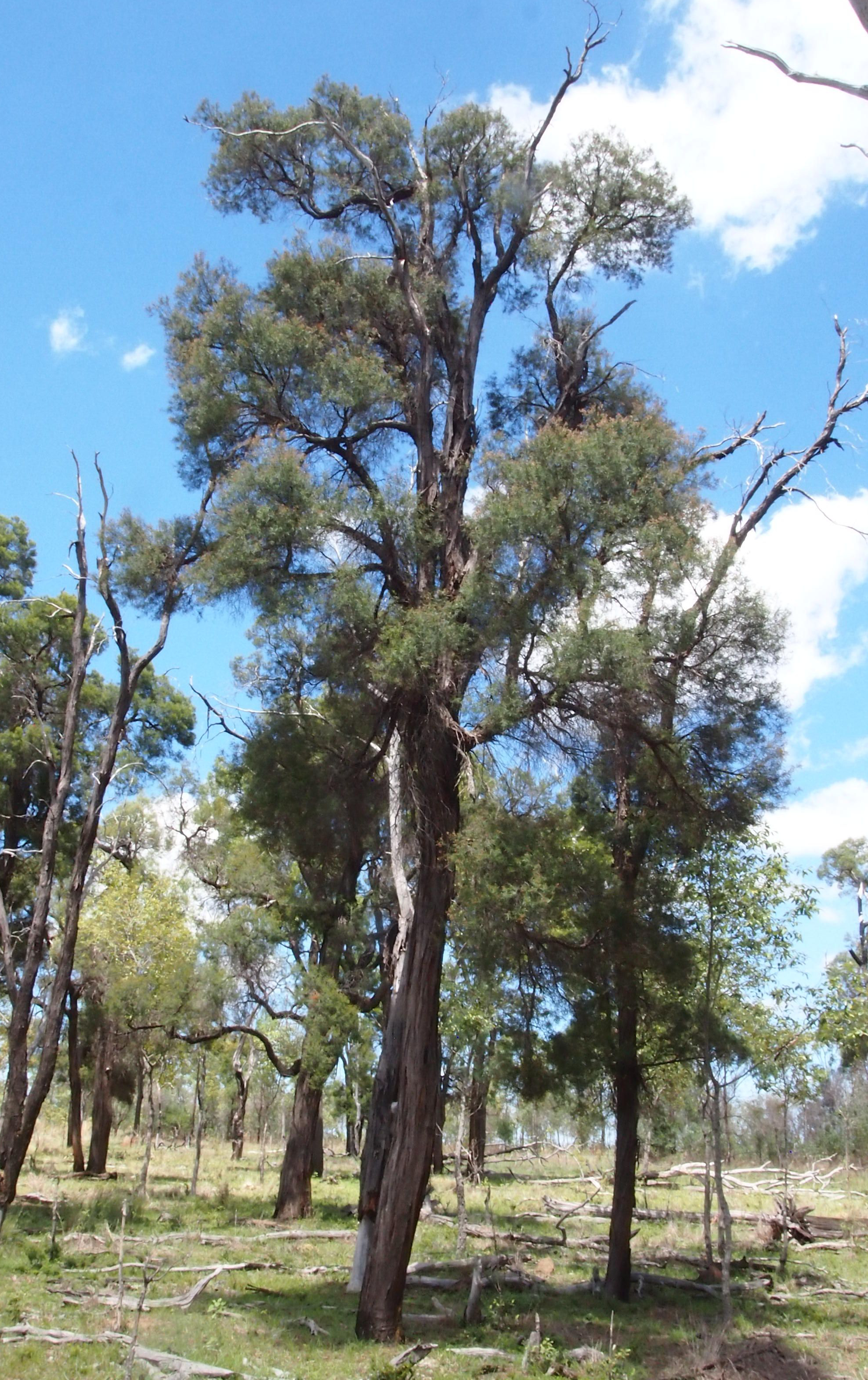

Scientific classification
- Kingdom: Plantae
- Clade: Embryophytes
- Clade: Tracheophytes
- Clade: Spermatophytes
- Clade: Angiosperms
- Clade: Eudicots
- Clade: Rosids
- Order: Myrtales
- Family: Myrtaceae
- Subfamily: Myrtoideae
- Tribe: Kanieae
- Genus: Lysicarpus; F.Muell.
- Species: L. angustifolius

Binomial name
- Lysicarpus angustifolius (Hook.) Druce

Synonyms
- Nani sect. Lysicarpus (F.Muell.) Kuntze; Tristania angustifolia Hook.; Lysicarpus ternifolius F.Muell.; Metrosideros ternifolia F.Muell.; Nania ternifolia (F.Muell.) Kuntze

= Lysicarpus =

budgeroo brown hazelwood

Genus of trees

Lysicarpus is a genus of trees in the family Myrtaceae described as a genus in 1858. It contains a single known species, Lysicarpus angustifolius, endemic to the State of Queensland in Australia. It is known there as the brown hazelwood or budgeroo.
