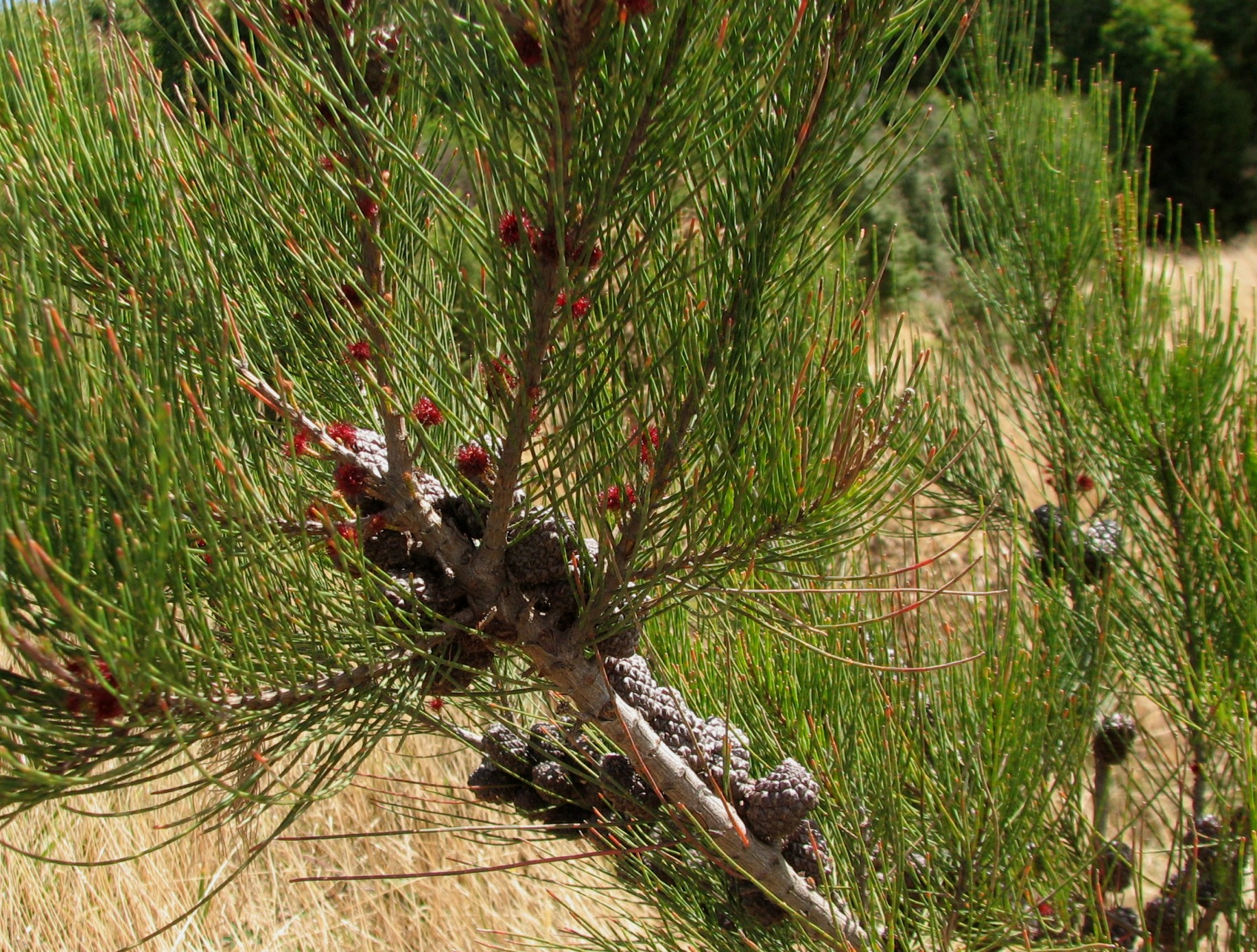
- Immature female and mature cones

Scientific classification
- Kingdom: Plantae
- Clade: Tracheophytes
- Clade: Angiosperms
- Clade: Eudicots
- Clade: Rosids
- Order: Fagales
- Family: Casuarinaceae
- Genus: Allocasuarina
- Species: A. paludosa

Binomial name
- Allocasuarina paludosa (Sieber ex Spreng.) L.A.S.Johnson
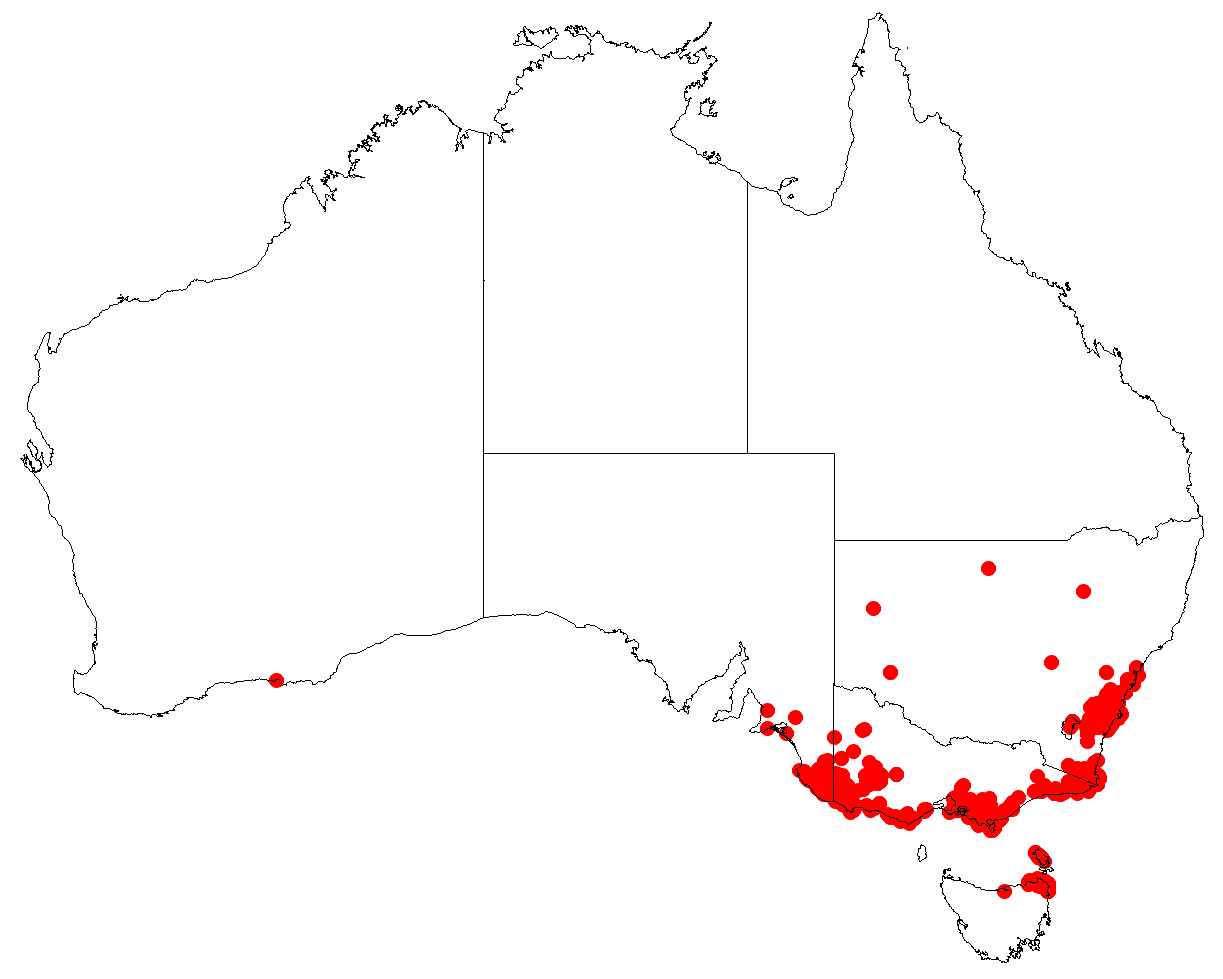
- Occurrence data from AVH

Synonyms
- List: Casuarina distyla var. paludosa (Sieber ex Spreng.) Benth.; Casuarina distyla var. prostrata Maiden & Betche; Casuarina paludosa Sieber ex Spreng.; Casuarina paludosa Sieber ex Spreng. var. paludosa; Casuarina pumila Otto & A.Dietr.; Casuarina pumila var. hirtella Miq.; Casuarina pumila Otto & A.Dietr. var. pumila; Casuarina bicuspidata auct. non Benth.: Rodway, L. (1903)

= Allocasuarina paludosa =

Species of plant

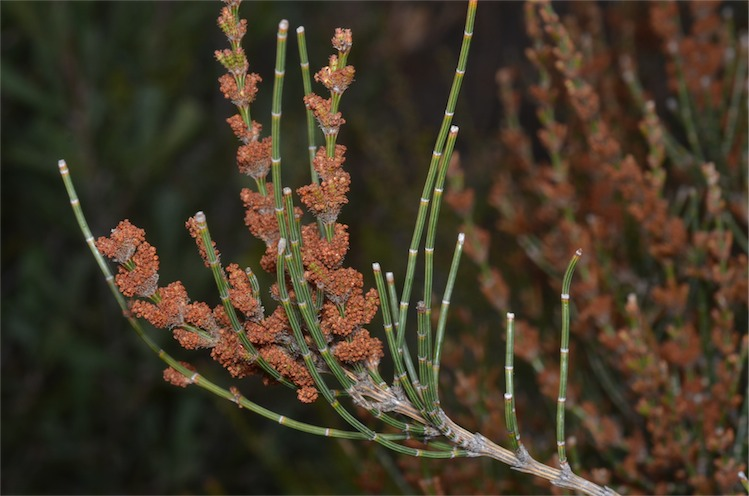
Male spikes

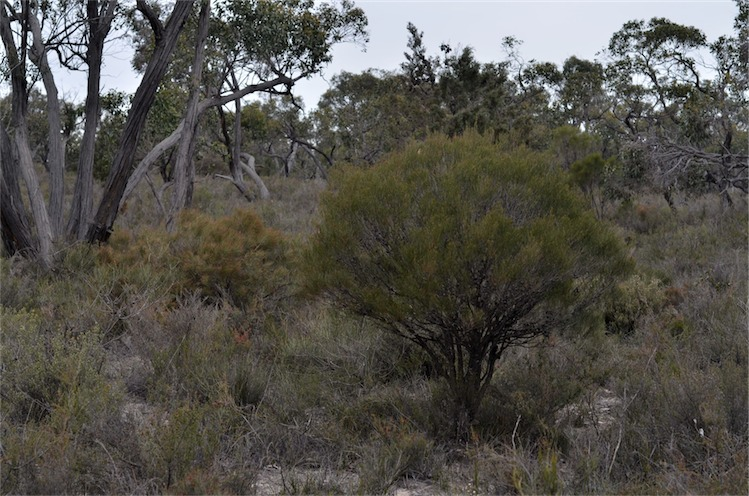
Habit in Little Desert National Park

Allocasuarina paludosa, commonly known as swamp she-oak or scrub sheoak, is a species of flowering plant in the family Casuarinaceae and is endemic to south-eastern continental Australia. It is a monoecious or dioecious shrub that has branchlets up to 200 mm (7.9 in) long, the leaves reduced to scales in whorls of six to eight, the fruiting cones 10–18 mm (0.39–0.71 in) long containing winged seeds 3.5–5.0 mm (0.14–0.20 in) long.

== Description ==
Allocasuarina paludosa is a spreading, monoecious or dioecious shrub that typically grows to a height of 0.3–4 m (1 ft 0 in – 13 ft 1 in). Its branchlets are more or less erect, up to 200 mm (7.9 in) long, the leaves reduced to erect or spreading, scale-like teeth 0.5–0.9 mm (0.020–0.035 in) long, arranged in whorls of six to eight around the branchlets. The sections of branchlet between the leaf whorls are 5–14 mm (0.20–0.55 in) long and 0.7–1 mm (0.028–0.039 in) wide. Male flowers are arranged in spikes 10–25 mm (0.39–0.98 in) long, with 7 to 9 whorls per centimetre (per 0.39 in.), the anthers 0.7–1.1 mm (0.028–0.043 in) long. Female cones are sessile or on a peduncle up to 2 mm (0.079 in) long, the mature cones cylindrical to oval, 10–18 mm (0.39–0.71 in) long and 7–13 mm (0.28–0.51 in) in diameter, the winged seeds dark brown to black and 3.5–5.0 mm (0.14–0.20 in) long.

== Taxonomy ==
This she-oak was first formally described in 1826 by Kurt Polycarp Joachim Sprengel who gave it the name Casuarina paludosa in Systema Vegetabilium, from an unpublished description by Franz Sieber. In 1989 Lawrie Johnson transferred the species to the genus Allocasuarina as A. paludosa in the Journal of the Adelaide Botanic Gardens. The specific epithet, (paludosa) means "marshy, swampy or boggy".

== Distribution and habitat ==
Allocasuarina paludosa grows in heath and in poorly drained soils near swamps at the edge of woodland on the coast and nearby tablelands of New South Wales south from Broken Bay, through southern Victoria to the far south-east of South Australia.
