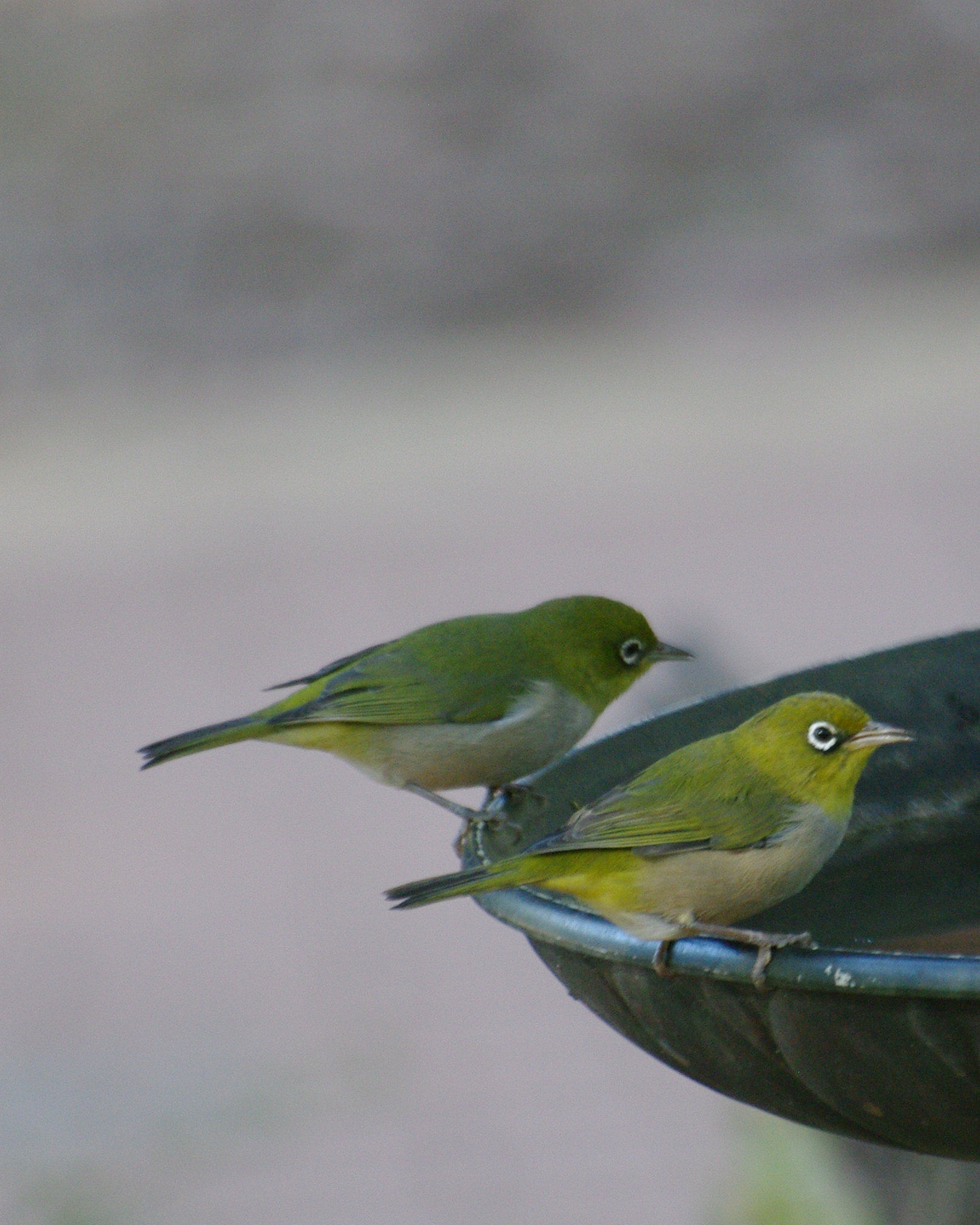
- Western silvereyes at Ngilgi Cave, Western Australia

Scientific classification
- Kingdom: Animalia
- Phylum: Chordata
- Class: Aves
- Order: Passeriformes
- Family: Zosteropidae
- Genus: Zosterops
- Species: Z. lateralis
- Subspecies: Z. l. chloronotus

Trinomial name
- Zosterops lateralis chloronotus Gould, 1841

Synonyms
- Zosterops lateralis gouldi; Zosterops chloronotus Gould, 1841; Zosterops gouldi Bonaparte, 1850; Zosterops shortridgii Ogilvie-Grant, 1909; Zosterops gouldi warreni Mathews, 1916; Zosterops australasiae edwini Mathews, 1923

= Western silvereye =

Subspecies of bird

The western silvereye (Zosterops lateralis chloronotus) is a small greenish bird in the Zosteropidae or white-eye family. It is a subspecies of the silvereye that occurs in Western Australia and South Australia. It is sometimes called the white-eye or greenie. Aboriginal names for the bird include jule-we-de-lung or julwidilang from the Perth area and poang from the Pallinup River.

== Distribution and habitat ==
The western silvereye is found in Southwest Australia with its range extending northwards to the vicinity of Shark Bay and Carnarvon, and rarely in winter as far as Point Cloates and the De Grey River. In the south its range extends eastwards along the south coast of Western Australia into South Australia at the head of the Great Australian Bight. It also occurs on many offshore islands, including the Houtman Abrolhos and the Archipelago of the Recherche. Habitats used by the bird include both wet and dry sclerophyll forest, temperate eucalypt woodland, mallee woodland and shrubland, and mangroves, as well as areas of and around human habitation.

== Description ==
The upperparts are entirely bright olive-green, with the wings and tail feathers grey, edged with green. The throat and undertail coverts are yellow-green, with the rest of the underparts grey. Circlets of small white feathers surround the eyes. Males are brighter yellow on the throat than females. The birds are 10–13 cm in length and weigh about 10 g. They give a variety of high-pitched calls, with the distinctive and constantly uttered contact call a thin ‘psee’.

== Taxonomy and nomenclature ==
The western silvereye is the only green-backed form of the silvereye found in Australia, the other subspecies there having grey backs. According to Serventy and Whittell, who treat it as a full species, the bird also lacks the pre-nuptial moult which characterise the eastern Australian populations of the species.

Because of such differences, the western silvereye has often been considered a full species. However, Schodde and Mason retain it in lateralis because, with a similar niche and voice, it replaces the eastern forms of the species in south-west Australia; because it is connected by a zone of intergradation with Z. l. pinarochrous in South Australia; and because mtDNA data links chloronotus with pinarochrous eastwards to western Victoria where the latter intergrades with Z. l. westernensis, showing that the various forms meeting in south-eastern Australia are linked by broad zones of morphological intergradation.

The specific (or subspecific) name gouldi Bonaparte, 1850, was previously applied to the bird on the mistaken presumption that chloronotus Gould, 1841 was a junior secondary homonym of Dicaeum chloronothos Vieillot, 1817 in Zosterops. Thus chloronotus is the senior synonym and has priority.

== Behaviour ==
Of the general behaviour of the western silvereye, Serventy and Whittell say:

”This is perhaps the commonest small bird in the Perth area and over much of the South-West. After the nesting season, by January, the birds gather into foraging flocks, which are noisily on the move until the pairs separate again next spring. In the city and suburbs they play the role of the Sparrow (Passer domesticus) in the eastern States, or the tits (Parus) in Europe, visiting gardens, shrubberies and even the backyard fowl-run.”

=== Breeding ===
The western silvereye usually builds a suspended cup-shaped nest of grasses in a shrub or tree. The grasses are bound with spider web and the inner cup lined with finer grasses, wool or horsehair. The cup is about 5 cm across and 2–3 cm deep. Clutch size is two or three, sometimes four, pale blue eggs. Both parents incubate the eggs for a period of 10–13 days, with the young birds leaving the nest about 12 days after hatching. Breeding takes place mainly in the wetter, coastal part of the range from September to January, with the birds forming large flocks and moving further afield once breeding has ceased. When breeding conditions are good, pairs can produce and raise up to four broods in a season.

=== Feeding ===
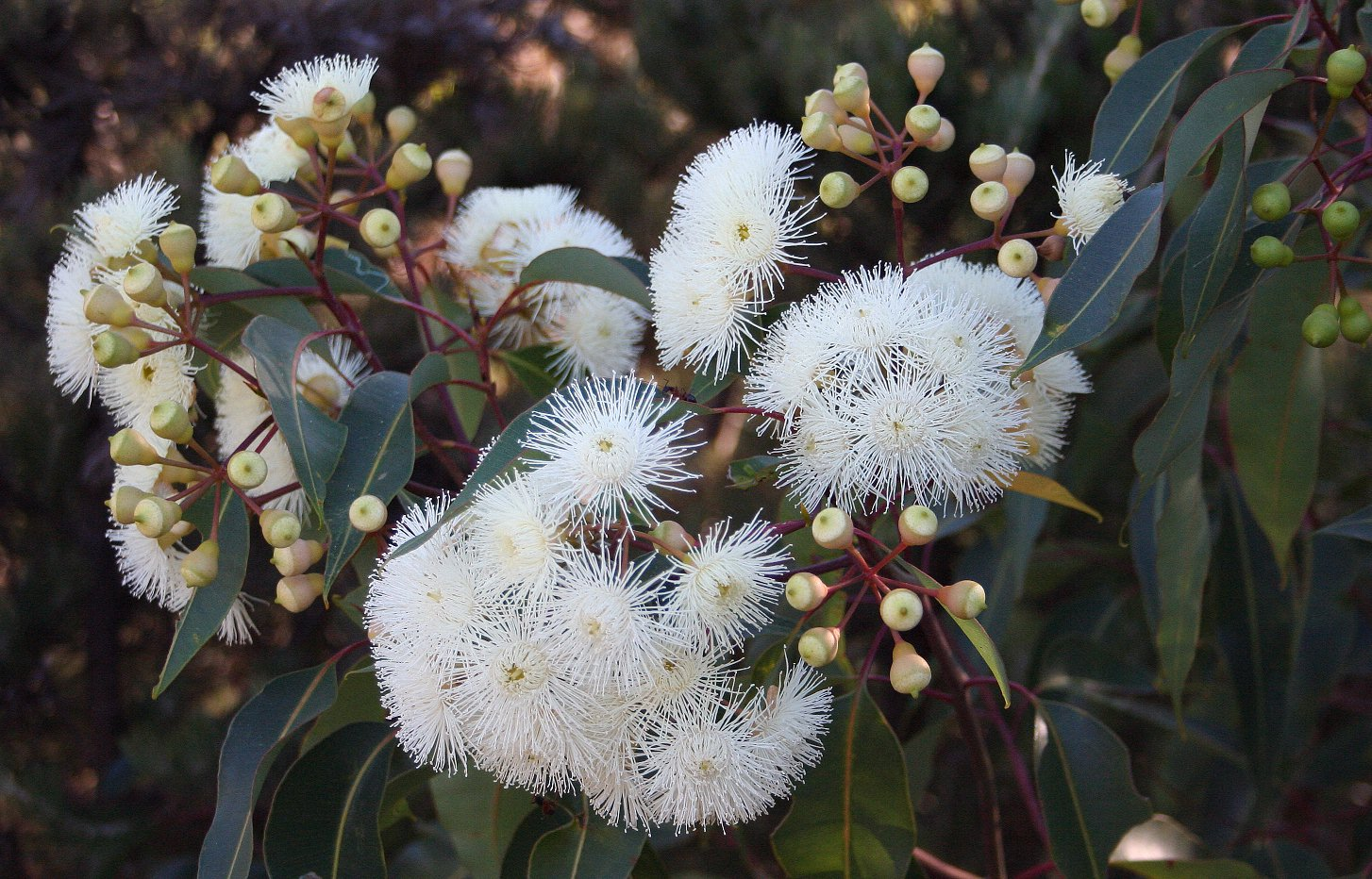
Nectar from marri flowers is a favoured food

Western silvereyes are omnivorous; they eat small insects as well as a wide variety of fruits and nectar. They form mixed-species foraging flocks with several other birds, especially weebills, western gerygones, western, inland and yellow-rumped thornbills, grey fantails and golden whistlers. In summer when their natural food supplies are scarce, they flock to vineyards and orchards and damage grapes and other soft fruits. When marri trees are flowering and producing large amounts of nectar in summer, damage to fruit is usually minimal.

== Relationship with humans ==
In Western Australia, the western silvereye is a declared pest of agriculture under the provisions of the Agriculture and Related Resources Protection Act 1976, administered by the Western Australian Department of Agriculture and Food.
