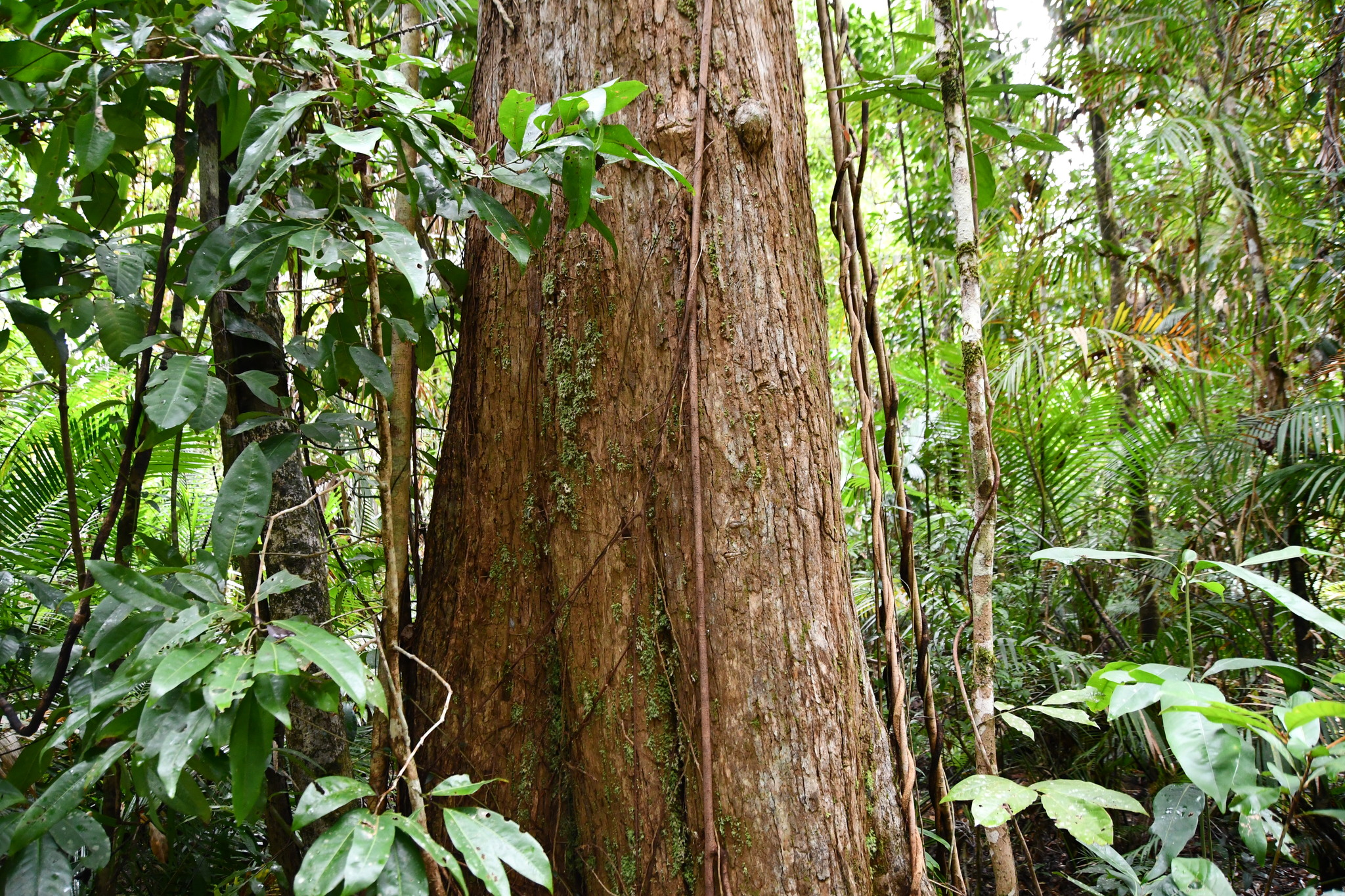
- Ristantia pachysperma

Scientific classification
- Kingdom: Plantae
- Clade: Tracheophytes
- Clade: Angiosperms
- Clade: Eudicots
- Clade: Rosids
- Order: Myrtales
- Family: Myrtaceae
- Subfamily: Myrtoideae
- Tribe: Kanieae
- Genus: Ristantia; Peter G.Wilson & J.T.Waterh.

Type species
- Ristantia pachysperma (F.Muell. & F.M.Bailey) Peter G.Wilson & J.T.Waterh.

= Ristantia =

Genus of flowering plants

Ristantia is a genus of plants in the family Myrtaceae, first described in 1982. The entire genus is endemic to the state of Queensland, Australia.

== Species ==
As of April 2025, Plants of the World Online accepts the following three species:

- Ristantia gouldii Peter G.Wilson & B.Hyland – listed as vulnerable
- Ristantia pachysperma (F.Muell. & F.M.Bailey) Peter G.Wilson & J.T.Waterh.
- Ristantia waterhousei Peter G.Wilson & B.Hyland
