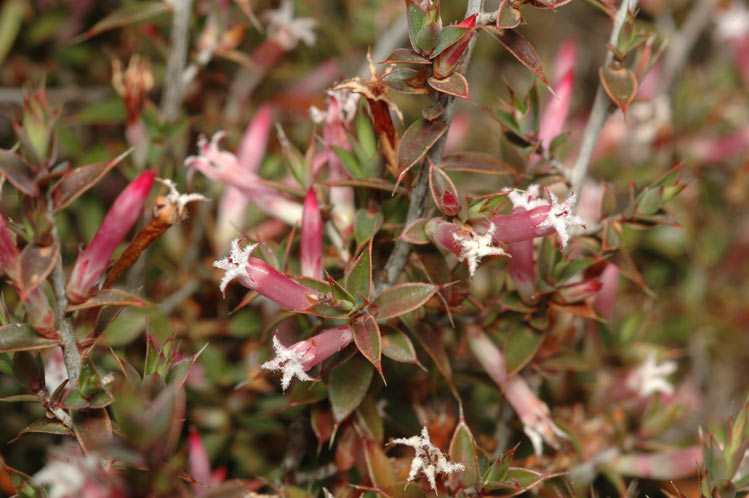
- In the Australian National Botanic Gardens

Scientific classification
- Kingdom: Plantae
- Clade: Tracheophytes
- Clade: Angiosperms
- Clade: Eudicots
- Clade: Asterids
- Order: Ericales
- Family: Ericaceae
- Genus: Styphelia
- Species: S. neoanglica

Binomial name
- Styphelia neoanglica (F.Muell. ex Benth.) F.Muell.
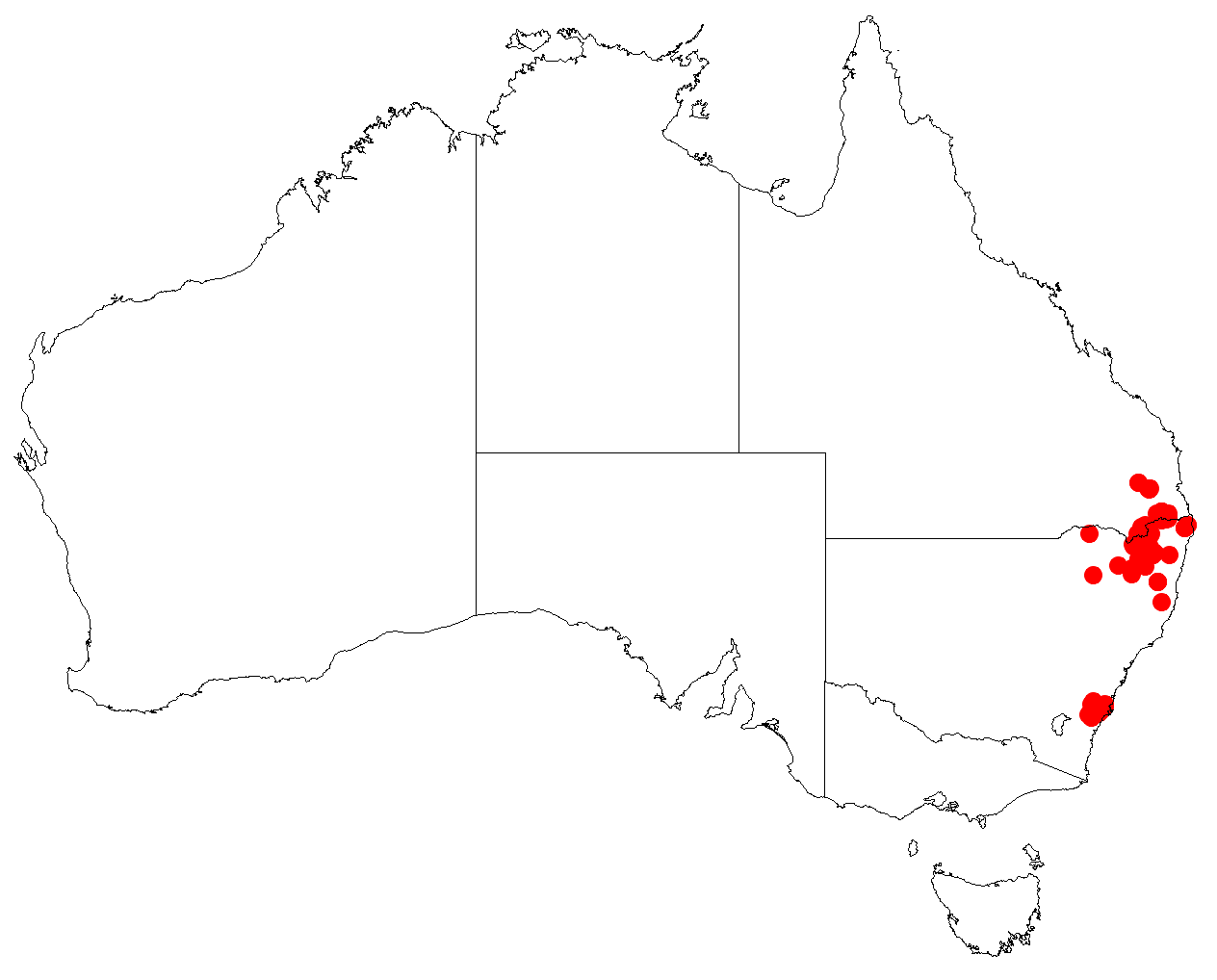
- Occurrence data from AVH

Synonyms
- Leucopogon neoanglicus F.Muell. ex Benth.

= Styphelia neoanglica =

Species of plant

Styphelia neoanglica, commonly known as New England beard heath, is a species of flowering plant in the heath family Ericaceae and is endemic to eastern Australia. It is an erect shrub with egg-shaped leaves, sometimes with the narrower end towards the base, and white, tube-shaped flowers arranged singly in leaf axils and bearded inside.

== Description ==
Styphelia neoanglica is an erect shrub that typically grows to a height of up to 80 cm (31 in), its branchlets with a rough surface. The leaves are broadly egg-shaped leaves, to egg-shaped with the narrower end towards the base, 5.6–10.3 mm (0.22–0.41 in) long and 2.3–4.6 mm (0.091–0.181 in) wide on a petiole about 0.3 mm (0.012 in) long. The leaves are glabrous with 3 parallel veins in the centre and others spreading. The flowers are erect and arranged in leaf axils with bracteoles 1.8–2.9 mm (0.071–0.114 in) long at the base. The sepals are 3.9–5 mm (0.15–0.20 in) long, the petals white and joined at the base to form a tube 5.0–7.7 mm (0.20–0.30 in) long with lobes 3.7–4.5 mm (0.15–0.18 in) long and bearded inside. Flowering occurs from March to October and the fruit is a glabrous, reddish-brown elliptic drupe about 3.2 mm (0.13 in) long.

== Taxonomy ==
This species was first formally described in 1868 by George Bentham in his Flora Australiensis and was given the name Leucopogon neoanglicus from an unpublished description by Ferdinand von Mueller. In 1882, von Mueller transferred the species to Styphelia as S. neoanglica in his Systematic Census of Australian Plants.

== Distribution and habitat ==
New England beard-heath usually grows in sandy soil on rocky outcrops on the coast and nearby tablelands at altitudes up to 600 m (2,000 ft), from south-east Queensland to the Budawang Range in south-eastern New South Wales.
