= Wild Iris =

Wild Iris may refer to:

- Wild forms of the plant Iris
- Dietes grandiflora, or large wild iris
- Dietes bicolor, or yellow wild iris
- Dietes iridioides, or wild iris
- Wild Iris (film), 2001
- The Wild Iris, a 1992 poetry book by Louise Glück
- Wild Iris, a 1974 art work at the Delaware Art Museum
- Wild Iris, a horse, winner of the 2004 Adrian Knox Stakes
