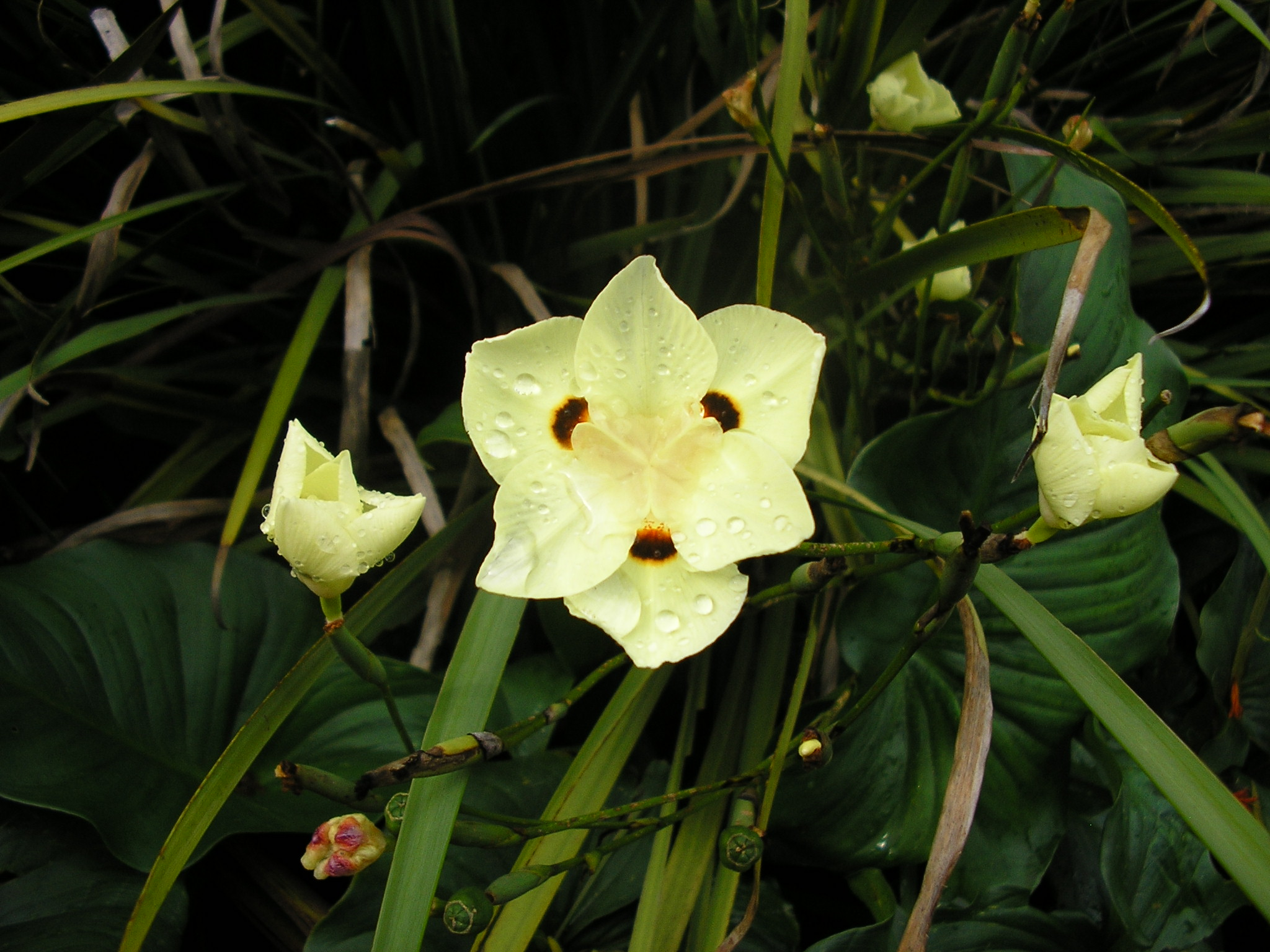

Scientific classification
- Kingdom: Plantae
- Clade: Tracheophytes
- Clade: Angiosperms
- Clade: Monocots
- Order: Asparagales
- Family: Iridaceae
- Genus: Dietes
- Species: D. bicolor

Binomial name
- Dietes bicolor (Steud.) Sweet ex Klatt

= Dietes bicolor =

Species of flowering plant

Dietes bicolor, the African iris, butterfly flag, fortnight lily, or peacock flower, is a clump-forming rhizomatous perennial plant with long sword-like evergreen pale green leaves, growing from multiple fans at the base of the clump. This species belongs to the iris family Iridaceae. It can form large clumps if left undisturbed for years. It is commonly cultivated in its native South Africa, where it is often used in public gardens, beautification of commercial premises and along roadsides. It is also cultivated in mild temperate zones elsewhere.

The blooms, appearing in spring and summer, are pale yellow with three dark purple spots, which may be so dark as to appear black. Each is surrounded by an orange outline. They are followed by a capsule that may bend the flower stalks to the ground. Ripe seeds (dark brown in colour) are dispersed when the capsule dries and splits.

The leaves of Dietes bicolor are narrower than those of Dietes grandiflora and Dietes iridioides, and tend to arch more.

== Cultivation ==
Plants prefer dappled-shade to full sun where they will flower in profusion, though they will grow in shaded areas (with an accompanying loss of flower production). This species, as well as Dietes grandiflora, is very drought tolerant.

== Gallery ==
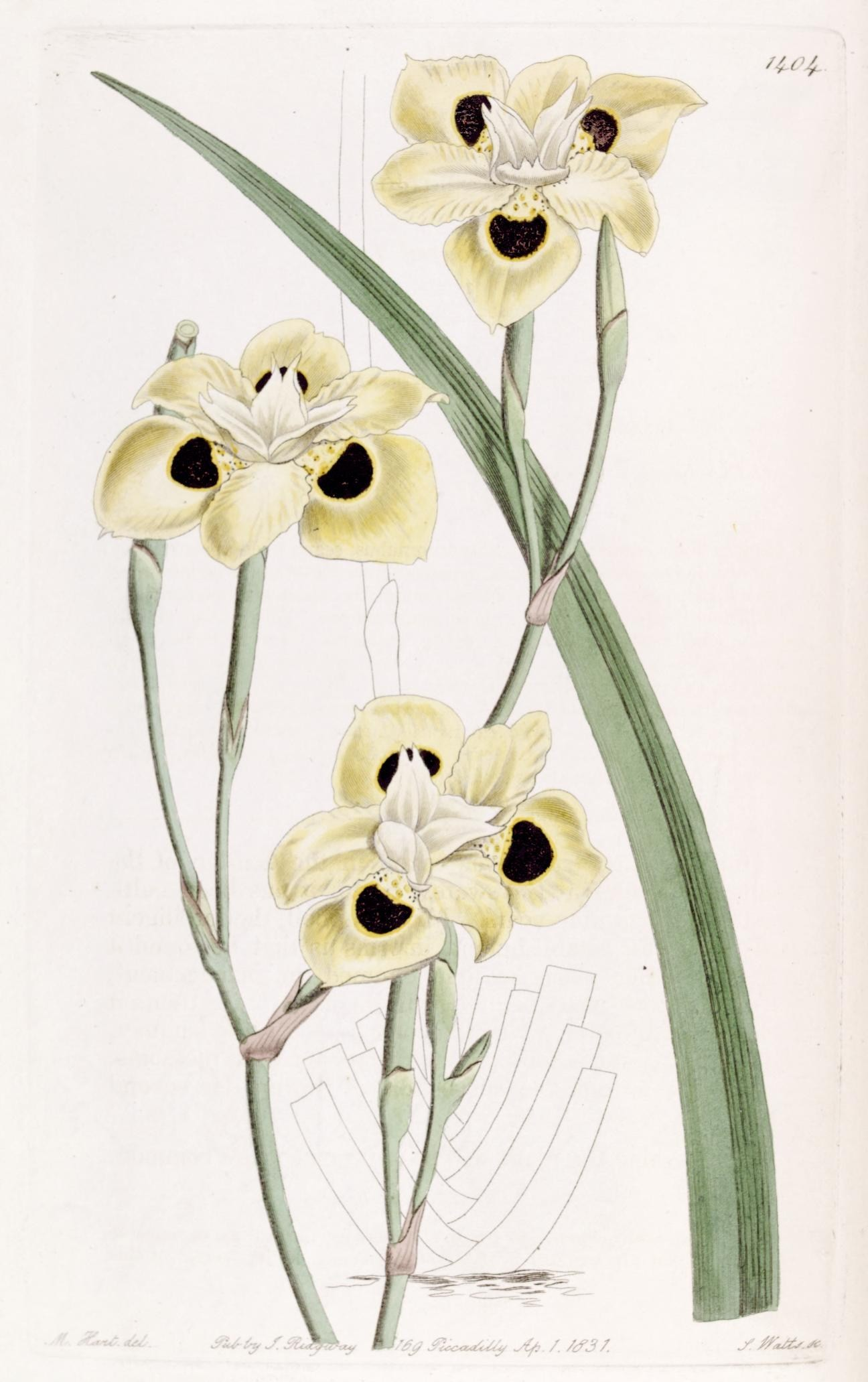
Pl. 1404 Edwards's botanical register

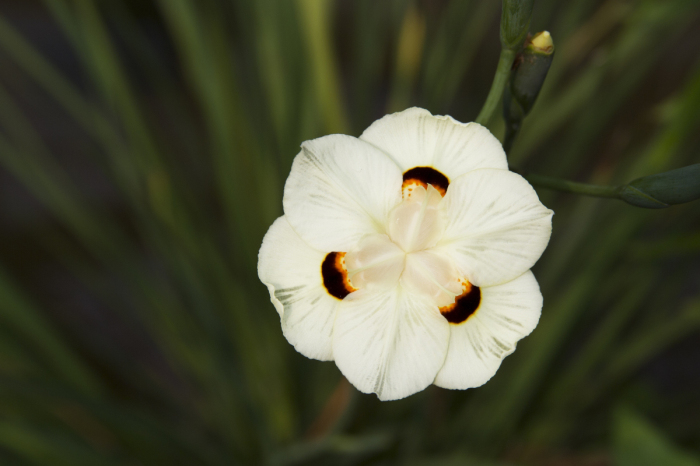
Flower

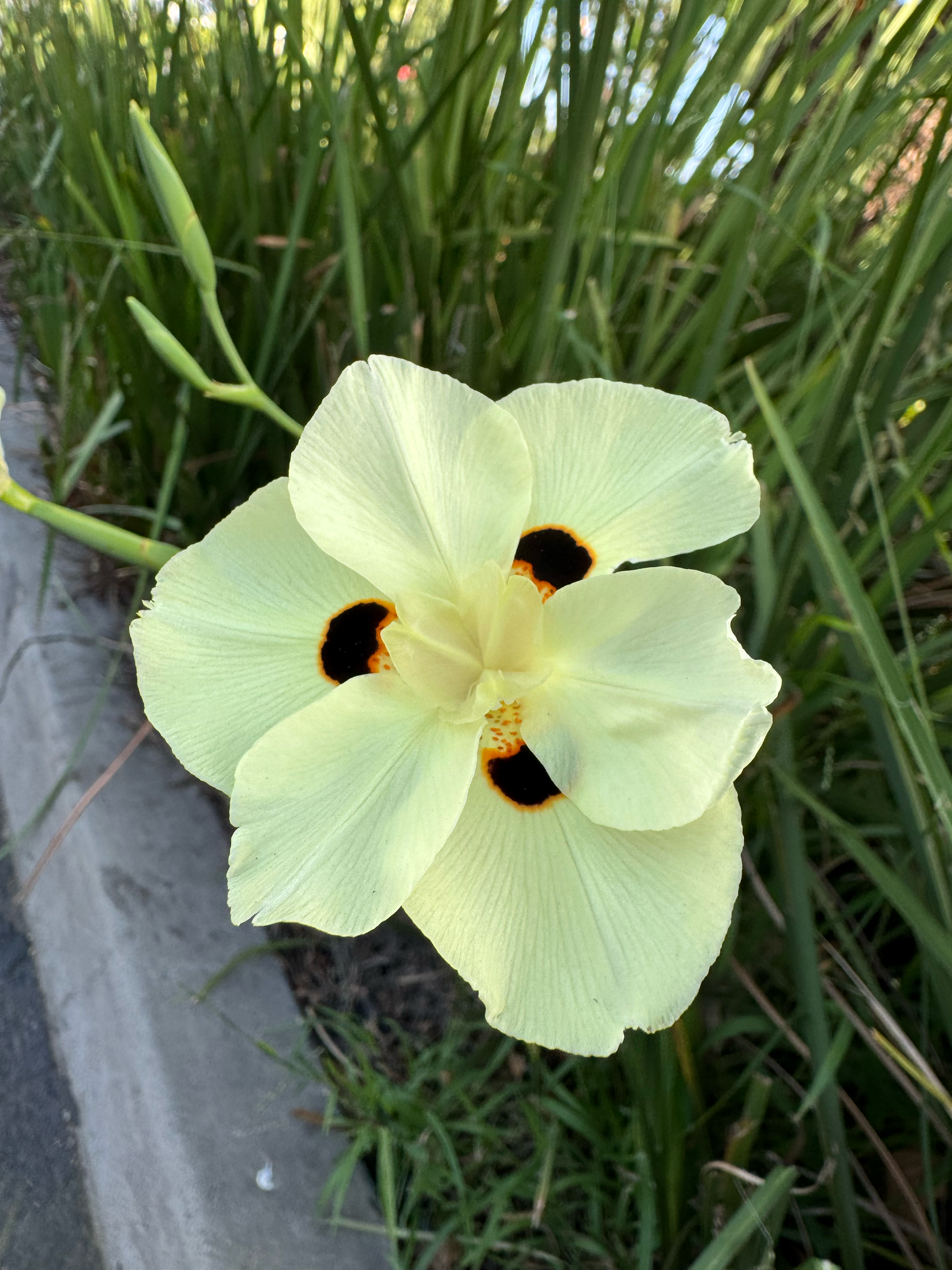
Flower

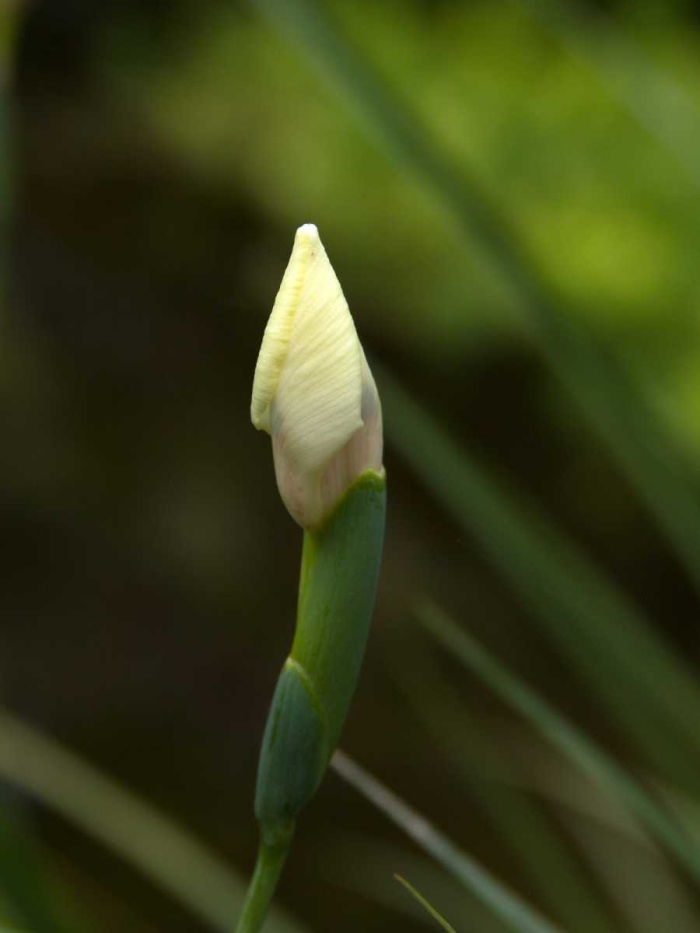
Bud

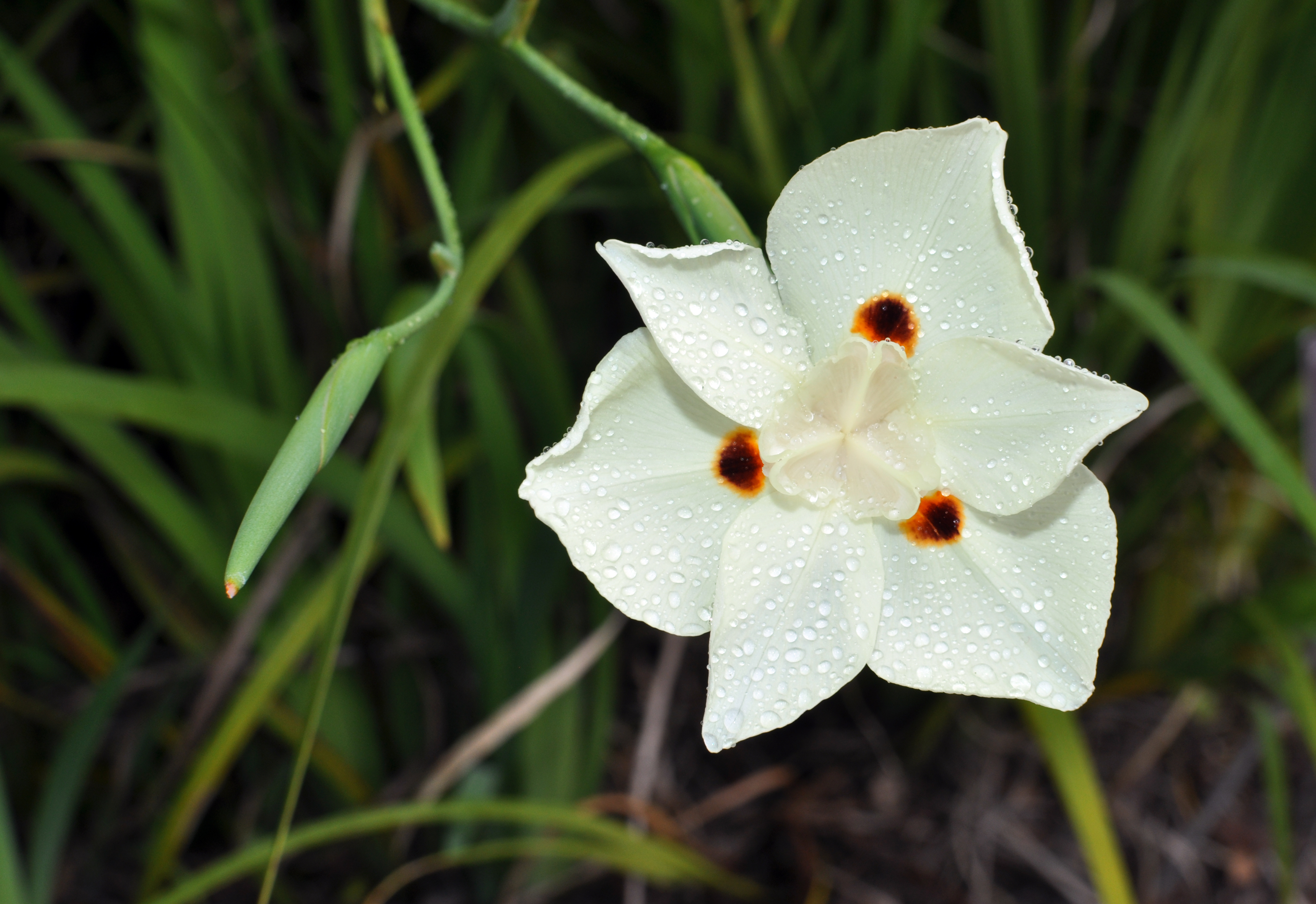
White variant
