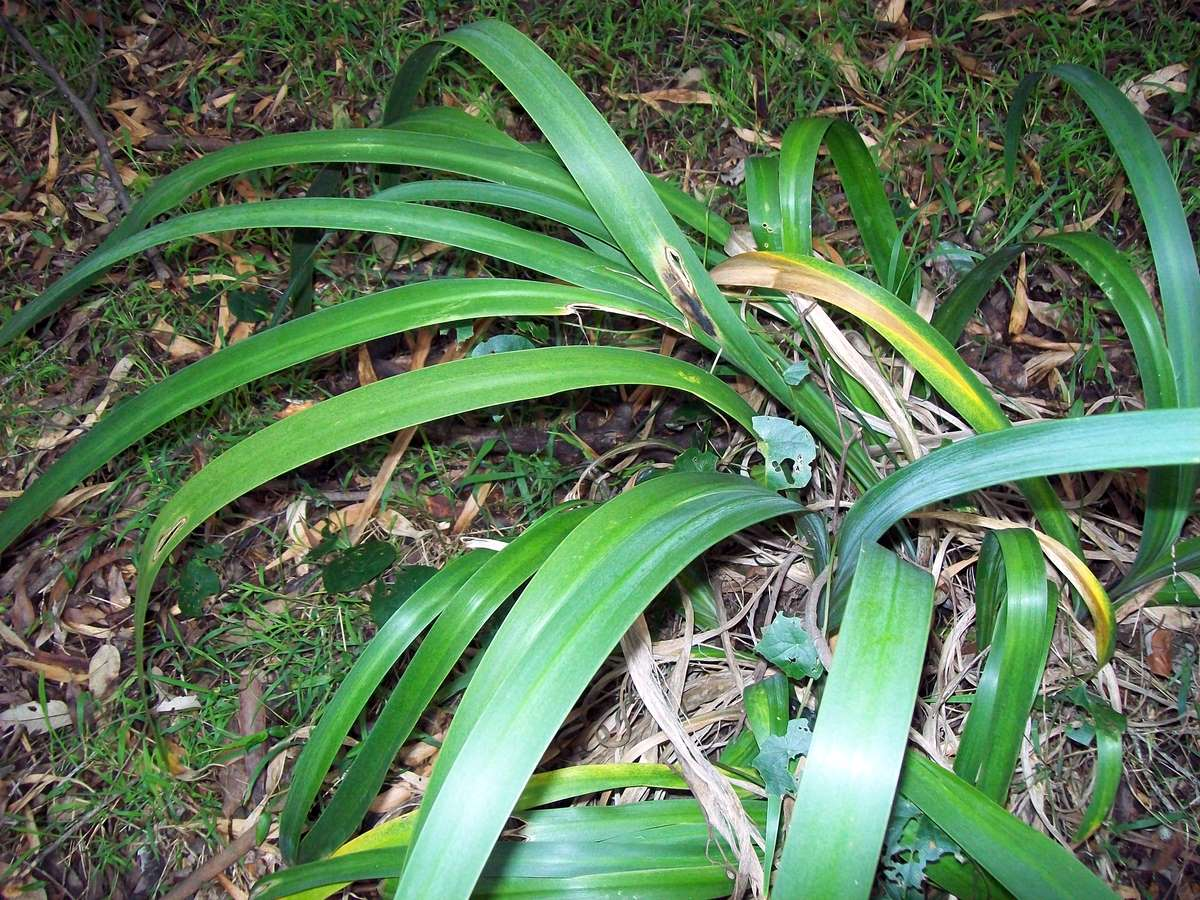

Scientific classification
- Kingdom: Plantae
- Clade: Tracheophytes
- Clade: Angiosperms
- Clade: Monocots
- Order: Asparagales
- Family: Iridaceae
- Genus: Dietes
- Species: D. robinsoniana

Binomial name
- Dietes robinsoniana (C.Moore & F.Muell.) Klatt

Synonyms
- Moraea robinsoniana (C.Moore F.Muell.) & Benth.; Iris robinsoniana C.Moore & F.Muell.

= Dietes robinsoniana =

Species of flowering plant

Dietes robinsoniana, the Lord Howe wedding lily, is found naturally only on Lord Howe Island, Australia. It grows on cliff faces, often in exposed locations. It is also Found on forest margins and the tops of Mount Gower and Mount Lidgbird and behind the beaches on Lord Howe Island. It is one of the world's most intriguing and remarkable biogeographic disjunctions, with its nearest phylogenetic relatives occurring in Africa.

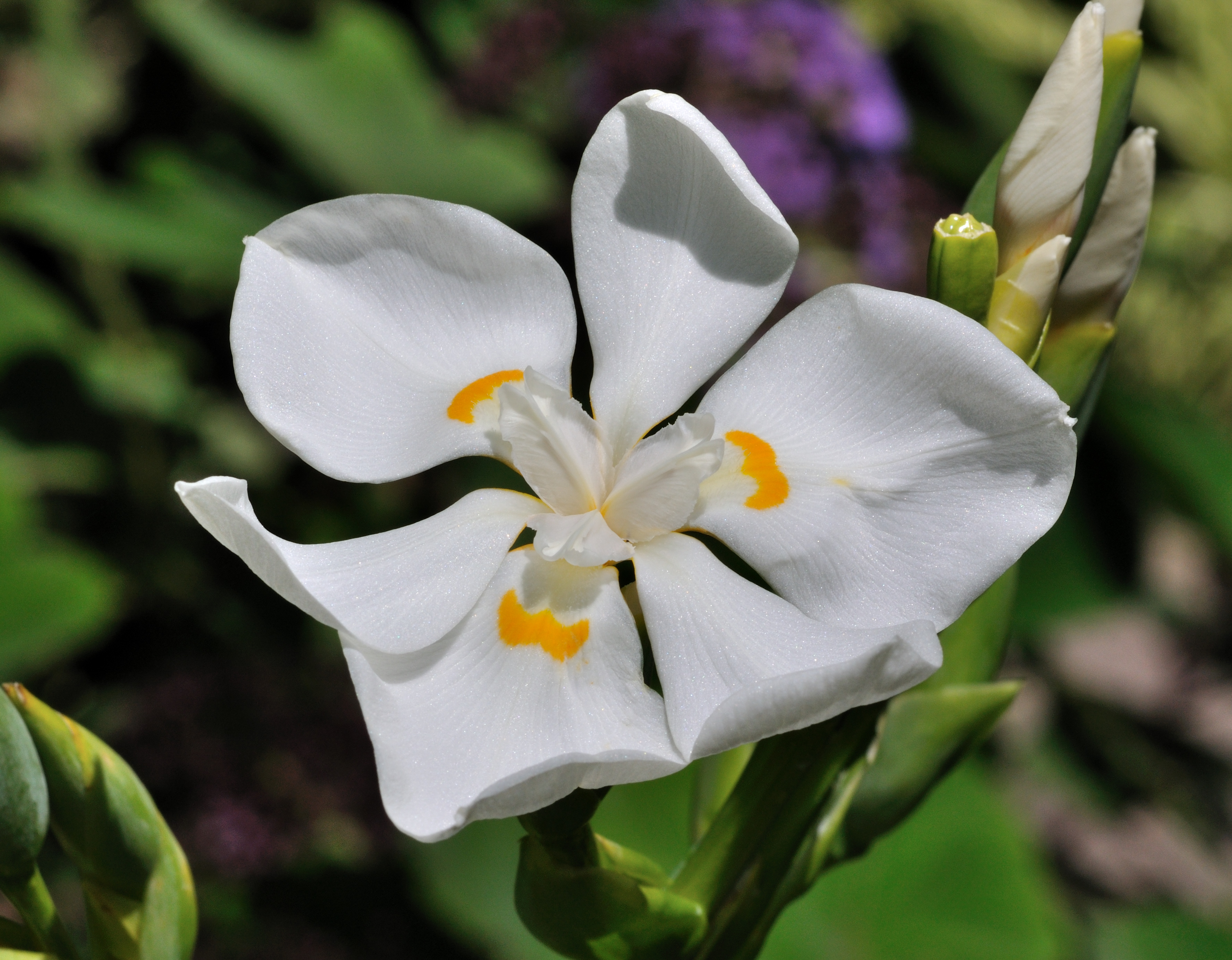
The flowers are white with yellow markings near the centre.

This is the largest plant in the genus Dietes. It does not tolerate cold temperatures. It is an uncommon plant, though it may be locally abundant in certain sites. Growing up to 1.5 metres (4 ft 11 in) tall, the leaves are sword-shaped or linear, 4 to 7 cm (1.6 to 2.8 in) wide. Flowering occurs from September to December. The flowers are white with yellow, lasting for one day only.

It produces flat triangular seeds in a roundish shaped capsule, 3 to 4 cm (1.2 to 1.6 in) long. The black seeds are around 10 mm long.

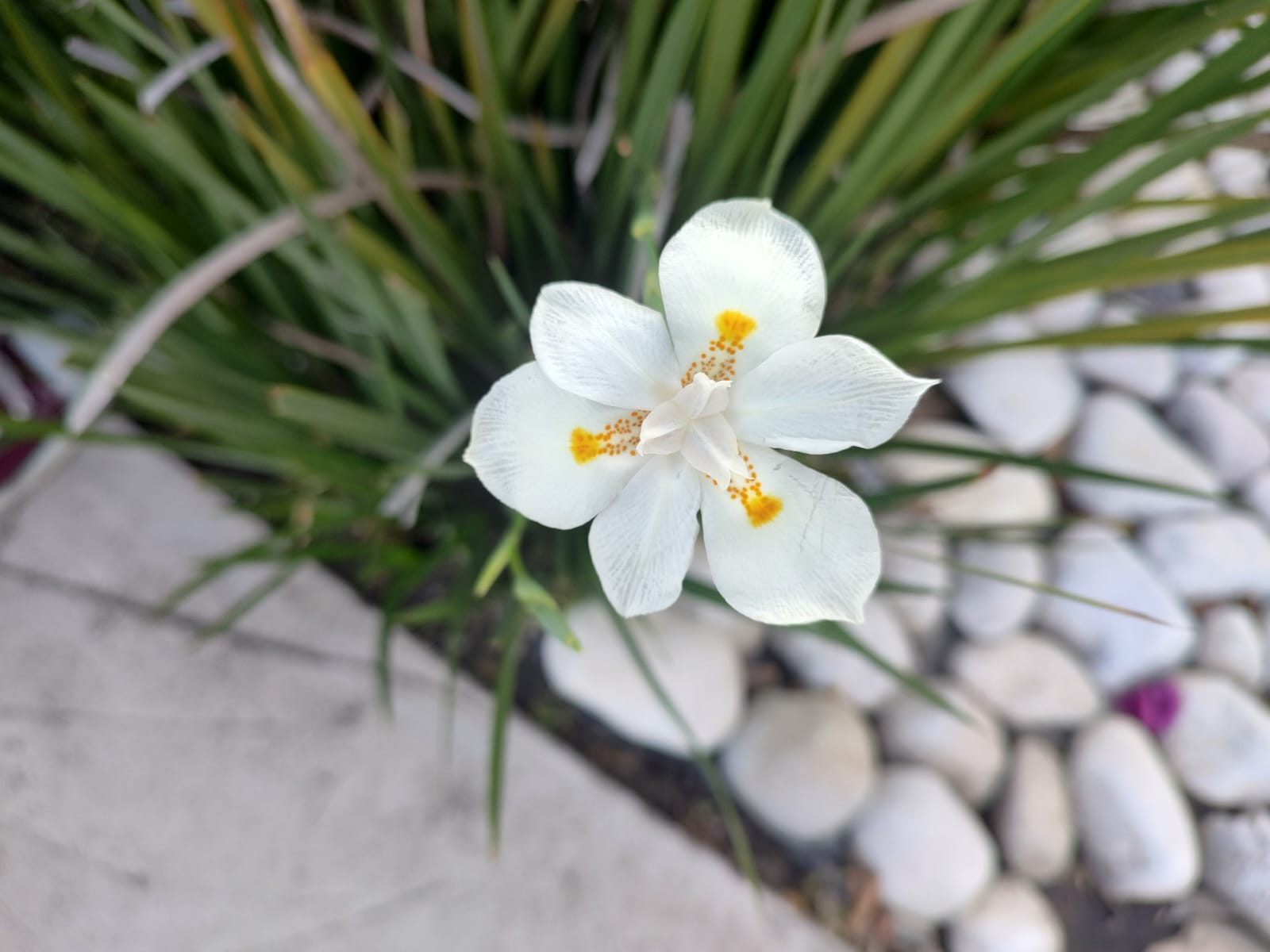
Dietes robinsoniana
