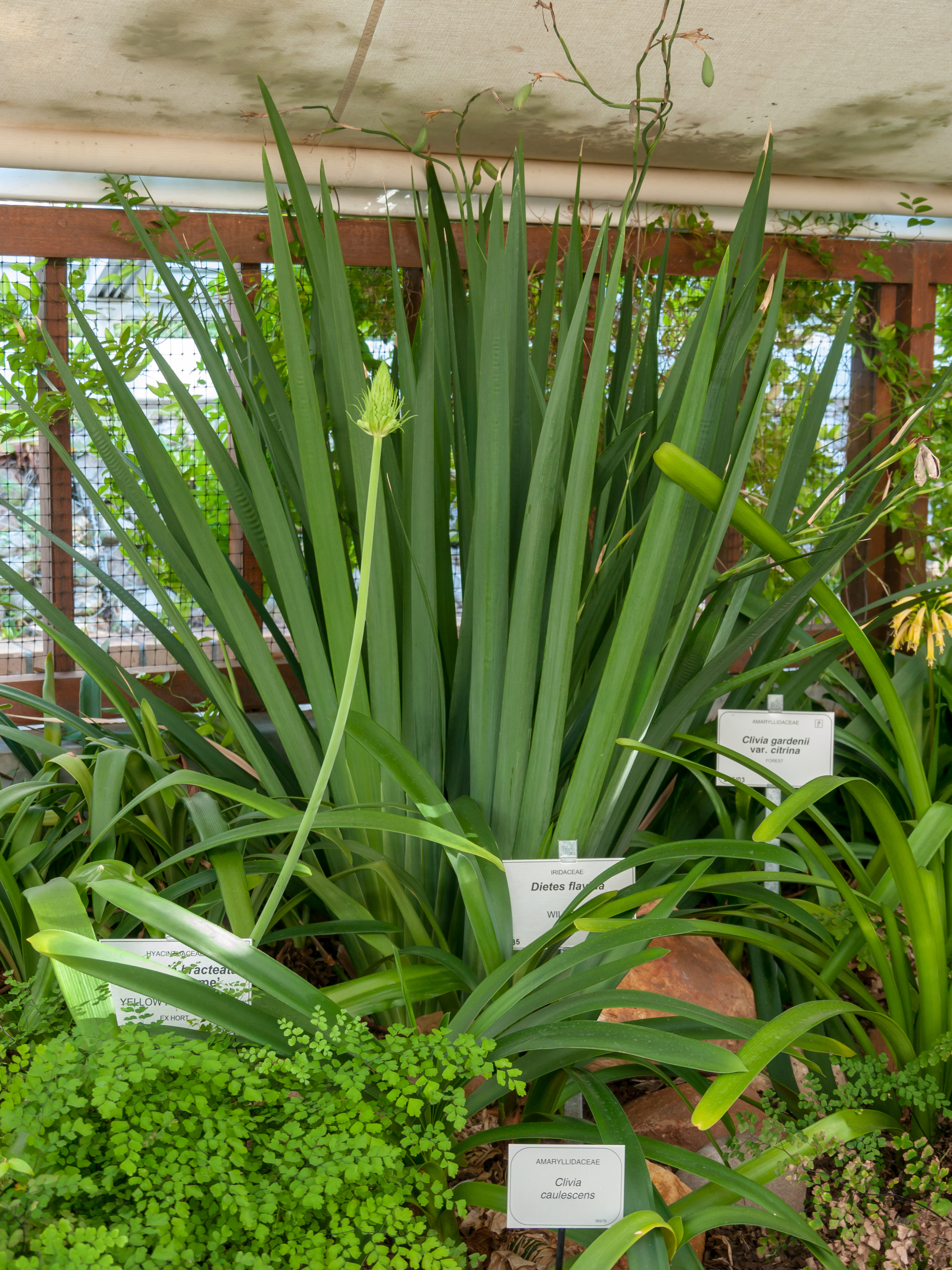

Scientific classification
- Kingdom: Plantae
- Clade: Tracheophytes
- Clade: Angiosperms
- Clade: Monocots
- Order: Asparagales
- Family: Iridaceae
- Genus: Dietes
- Species: D. flavida

Binomial name
- Dietes flavida Oberm.

= Dietes flavida =

Species of flowering plant

Dietes flavida is a small shrub and geophyte that flowers from October to January. The species is native to Eswatini, KwaZulu-Natal and Mozambique.
