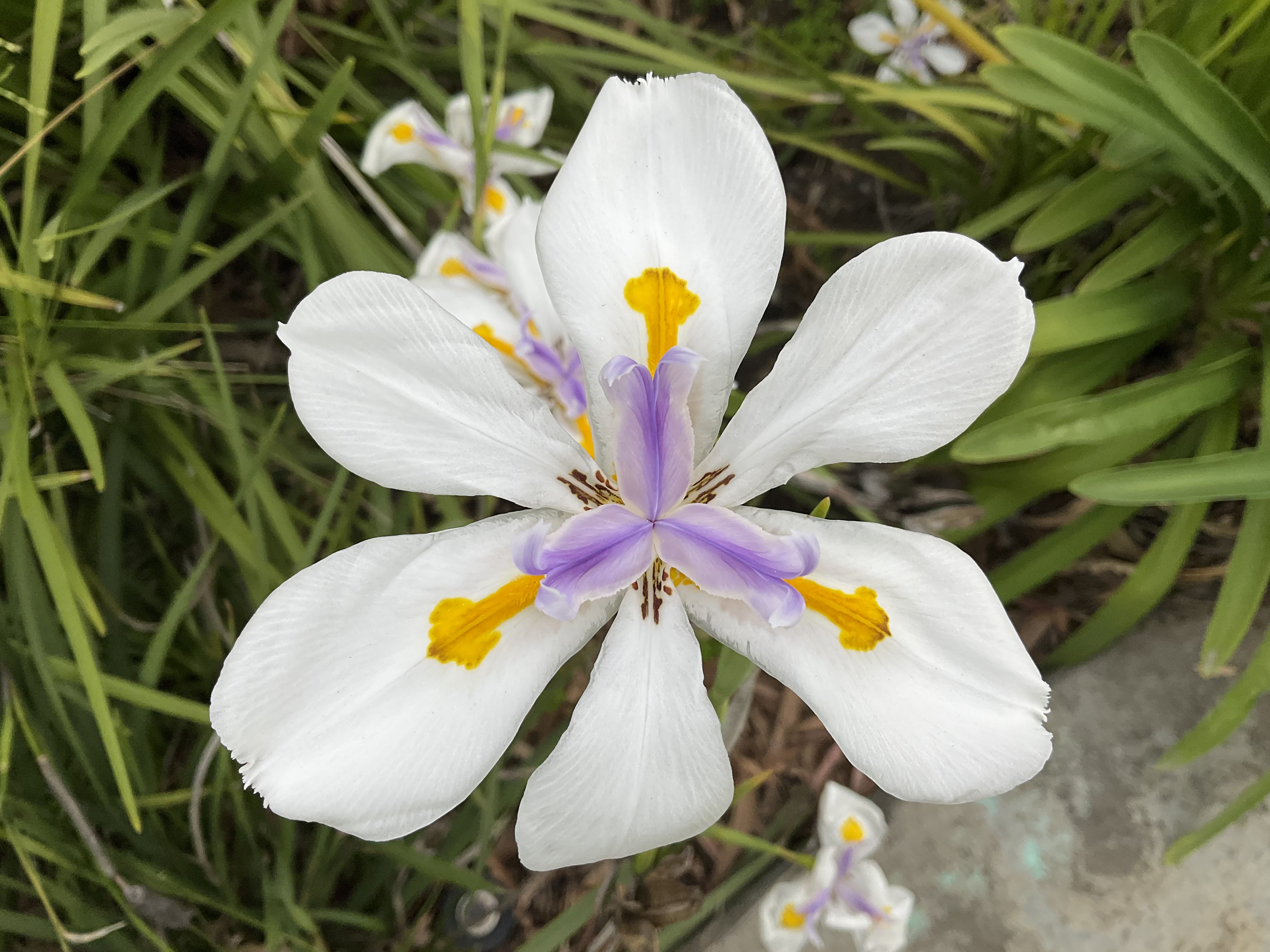
- Dietes grandiflora

Scientific classification
- Kingdom: Plantae
- Clade: Embryophytes
- Clade: Tracheophytes
- Clade: Spermatophytes
- Clade: Angiosperms
- Clade: Monocots
- Order: Asparagales
- Family: Iridaceae
- Subfamily: Iridoideae
- Tribe: Irideae
- Genus: Dietes; Salisb. ex Klatt

Type species
- Dietes compressa (Linnaeus fil.) Klatt

Synonyms
- Naron Medik.

= Dietes =

Genus of flowering plants

Dietes is a genus of six rhizomatous plant species of the iris family Iridaceae, first described collectively in 1866. Common names for the different species include wood iris, fortnight lily, African iris, Japanese iris and butterfly iris. Globally, these common names may differ from region to region, and may also apply to one or more species within Dietes.

Most of the Dietes are endemic to southern and central Africa; one (Dietes robinsoniana) is native to Lord Howe Island, off the eastern Pacific coast of Australia. A few others—primarily Dietes bicolor, D. grandiflora and D. iridioides—have become popular gardening and landscaping plants around the world, and have thus inevitably naturalised in areas outside of their natural range, including across much of the Americas, from the United States (Alabama, Florida, Georgia, Hawaii, Louisiana, Mississippi, Nevada, South Carolina, Southern California and the Bay Area, Texas) through Mexico and much of Central and South America, Bermuda, the Bahamas, Hispaniola and Jamaica. Elsewhere, these species have been documented in the Azores, the Canary Islands, Madeira, southern France, Spain, Portugal, Sicily, Israel, Istanbul, Palestine, Madagascar, Mauritius, Réunion, St. Helena, Hong Kong, Java (Indonesia), Sikkim (India), Singapore, Taiwan, and Tokyo, Japan. They are also found in Australia (near Adelaide and Perth, and much of New South Wales, Queensland, Tasmania, and Victoria), New Caledonia and New Zealand.

== Taxonomy ==
These plants were formerly placed in the genus Moraea, but were reclassified because they are rhizomatous. Like Moraea, they differ from Iris in having flowers with six free tepals that are not joined into a tube at their bases.

Some references mention the species Dietes vegeta or D. vegeta variegata, springing from some confusion with Moraea vegata (which grows from a corm, not a rhizome). The name D. vegeta is commonly misapplied to both D. grandiflora or D. iridioides.

The genus name is derived from the Greek words di-, meaning "two", and etes, meaning "affinities".

Species

Image	Scientific name	Distribution
	Dietes bicolor (Steud.) Sweet ex Klatt (yellow wild iris, peacock flower, butterfly iris)	Cape Province, KwaZulu-Natal
	Dietes butcheriana Gerstner	Cape Province, KwaZulu-Natal
	Dietes flavida Oberm.	South Africa, Eswatini
	Dietes grandiflora N.E.Br. (wild iris, large wild iris, fairy iris)	Cape Province, KwaZulu-Natal; naturalized in St. Helena, Mauritius, Rodrigues Island in Indian Ocean, Western Australia
	Dietes iridioides (L.) Sweet ex Klatt (wild iris, African iris, Cape iris, fortnight lily, morea iris)	widespread from Ethiopia to Cape Province; naturalized in Madeira, Mauritius, Réunion, Hawaii, Jamaica
	Dietes robinsoniana (F.Muell.) Klatt (wedding lily)	Lord Howe Island (part of New South Wales)

Dietes bicolor has cream or yellow flowers. D. grandiflora and D. iridioides both have white flowers marked with yellow and violet, and appear similar in photographs, but they are quite different: those of grandiflora are much larger, last three days, and have dark spots at the base of the outer tepals, while those of iridioides are small, last only one day, and lack the spots. D. grandiflora is also a larger plant overall.

== Bibliography ==
- Floridata: Dietes
- Goldblatt, P. (1981) Systematics, physiology and evolution of Dietes (Iridaceae). Annals of the Missouri Botanical Garden 68: 132–153.
