= Dietes butcheriana =

Scientific classification
- Kingdom: Plantae
- Clade: Tracheophytes
- Clade: Angiosperms
- Clade: Monocots
- Order: Asparagales
- Family: Iridaceae
- Genus: Dietes
- Species: D. butcheriana

Binomial name
- Dietes butcheriana Gerstner

Species of flowering plant

Dietes butcheriana is a small shrub and geophyte. The species is endemic to KwaZulu-Natal and the Eastern Cape.
