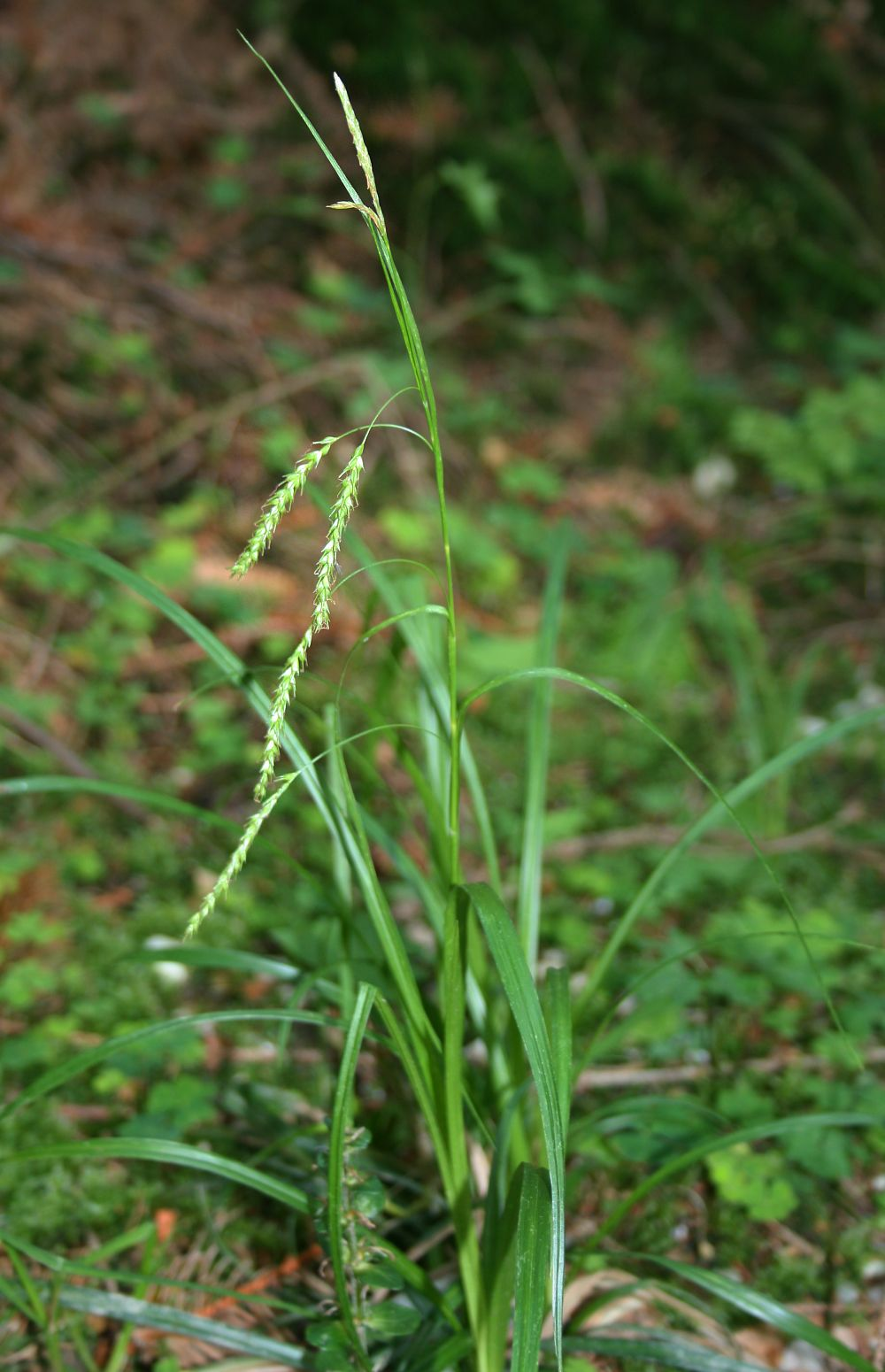

Scientific classification
- Kingdom: Plantae
- Clade: Tracheophytes
- Clade: Angiosperms
- Clade: Monocots
- Clade: Commelinids
- Order: Poales
- Family: Cyperaceae
- Genus: Carex
- Species: C. sylvatica

Binomial name
- Carex sylvatica Huds.

= Carex sylvatica =

Species of grass-like plant

Carex sylvatica is a species of sedge found in deciduous woodlands across Europe. It typically reaches 60 cm (24 in) tall, and has an inflorescence made up of 3–5 pendent female spikes and a single male spike. It is also used as a garden plant, and has been introduced to North America and New Zealand.

== Description ==
Carex sylvatica "resembles a small C. pendula", growing to around 15–60 centimetres (6–24 in) tall, or up to 150 cm (5 ft) in exceptional cases. Its rhizomes are very short, giving the plant a densely cespitose (tufted) form. The leaves are 5–60 cm (2.0–23.6 in) long, 3–7 mm (0.12–0.28 in) wide and 1.0–1.3 mm (0.04–0.05 in) thick, with 17–31 parallel veins. The leaves have a slight keel, or are folded gently into an M-shape in cross-section.

The top half or third of the stem bears the inflorescence, typically comprising 3–5 female spikes and a single apical male spike, which may include a few female flowers at its base. The female spikes are each 2.0–6.5 cm (0.8–2.6 in) long, and are held dangling on long, rough peduncles, arising from within a long leaf-sheath. The male spike is much thinner, and is 1–4 cm (0.4–1.6 in) long.

== Taxonomy ==
Carex sylvatica was first described by the English botanist William Hudson in his 1762 work Flora Anglica. Hybrids have been reported between C. sylvatica and C. strigosa (in France) and between C. sylvatica and C. hirta (in Austria). Its English common name is "wood-sedge", or, in North America, "European woodland sedge".

== Distribution and ecology ==
Carex sylvatica is found across Europe, and into parts of Asia, as far east as Iran. It has also been introduced to North America, where it occurs in Ontario, New York and North Carolina, and to New Zealand, where it was first recorded in 1969.

In its native range, C. sylvatica lives in deciduous woodlands on heavy soils; it is sometimes found in unwooded areas, but usually only as a relic of ancient woodland. In North America, it is generally found in disturbed areas within deciduous woodland.

== Uses ==
Carex sylvatica can be used in gardens as ground cover under trees or shrubs. Carl Linnaeus recorded that the Sami people used the plant as an insulating wadding.
