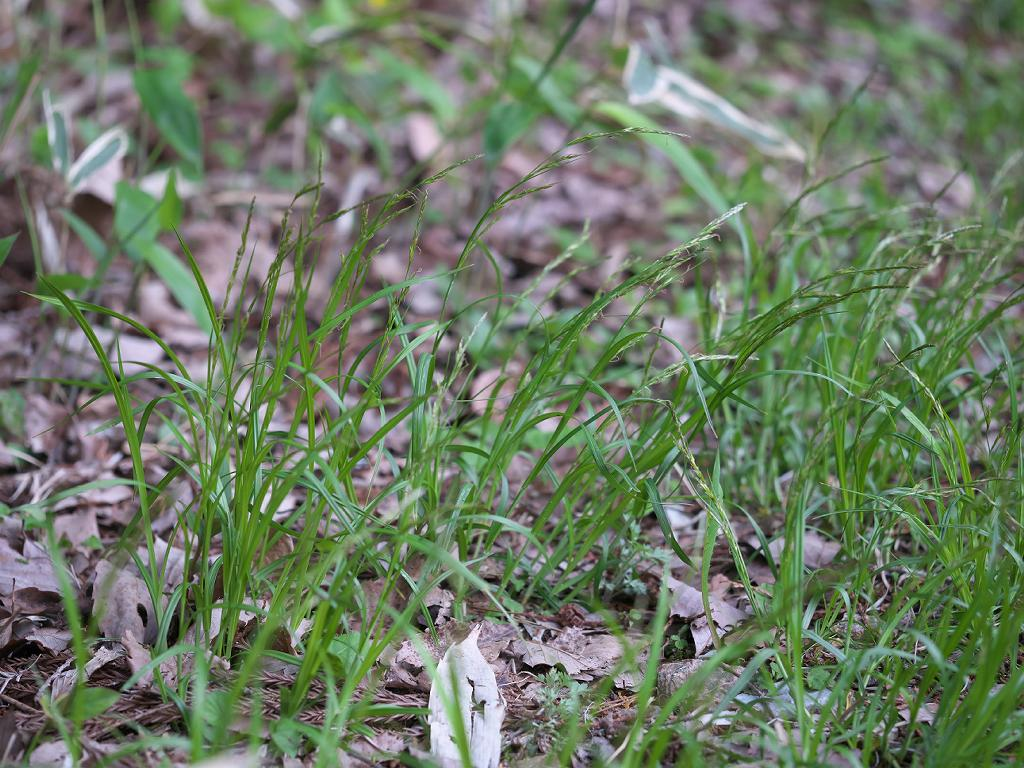

Scientific classification
- Kingdom: Plantae
- Clade: Tracheophytes
- Clade: Angiosperms
- Clade: Monocots
- Clade: Commelinids
- Order: Poales
- Family: Cyperaceae
- Genus: Carex
- Species: C. bostrychostigma

Binomial name
- Carex bostrychostigma Maxim.

Synonyms
- Carex explens Kük.; Carex stenantha C.B.Clarke

= Carex bostrychostigma =

Species of grass-like plant

Carex bostrychostigma, also known as curled-stigma sedge, is a sedge that is found in eastern Russia, eastern and central China, Korea and parts of Japan.

== Description ==
The sedge is ligneous with an elongated rhizome. The sheaths that cover the rhizome fall apart into dark brown fibres. It is composed of densely tufted slender, smooth and trigonous culms which are 20 to 50 cm (7.9 to 19.7 in) in length. The leaves are usually shorter than the culms and have flat and scabrous 3 to 4 mm (0.12 to 0.16 in) wide blades.

== Distribution ==
The sedge grows in temperature biomes and is found in far eastern parts of Russia in eastern Amur and the Primorye regions. In China the native range is in eastern parts including Manchuria and northern parts of Central China. It is also a native of Korea and Japan.

== Taxonomy ==
The species was first described by Karl Maximovich in 1886 in the Bulletin de l'Académie impériale des sciences de St.-Pétersbourg.

== See also ==
- List of Carex species
