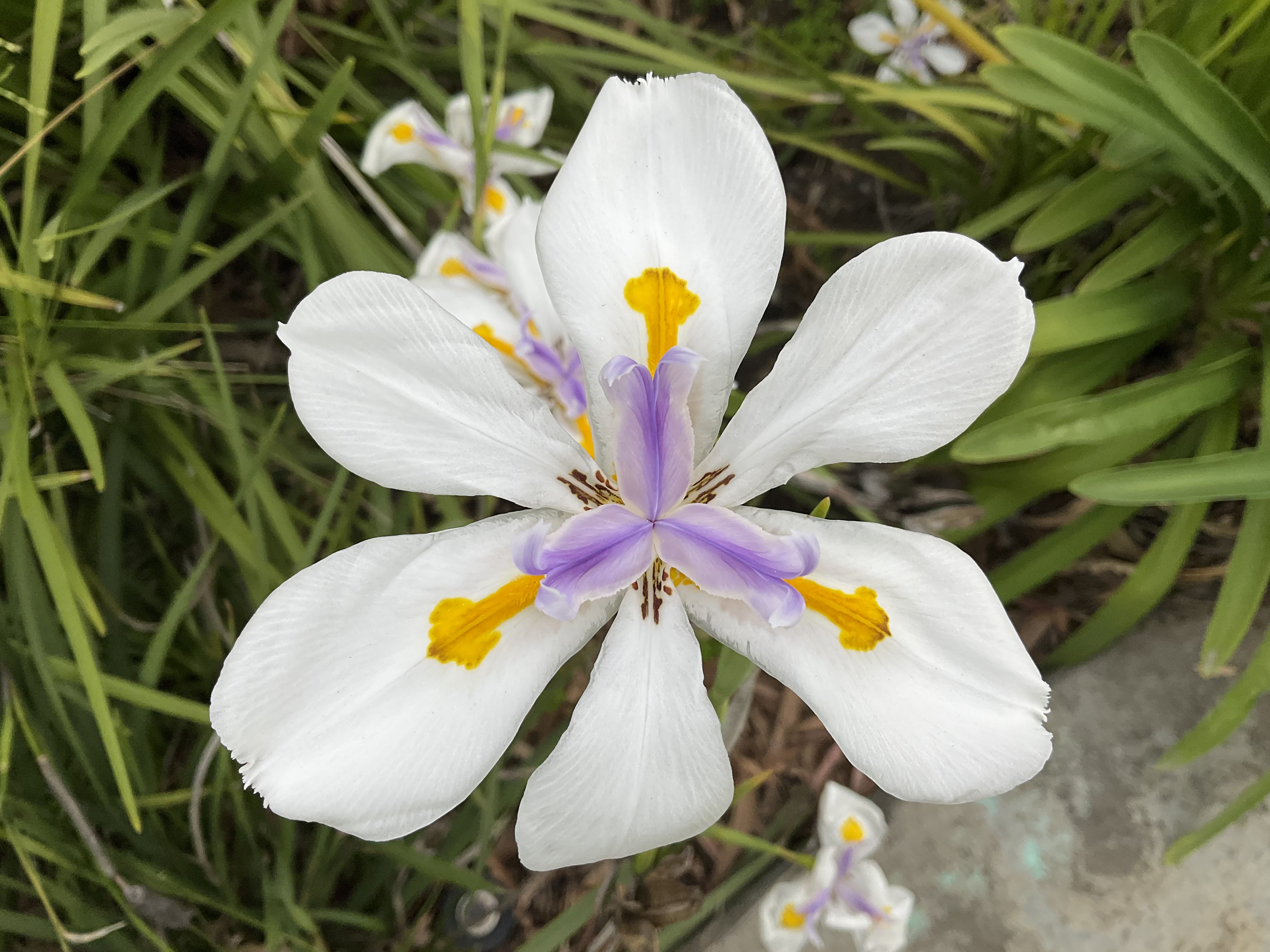
- At the La Brea Tar Pits (California)

Scientific classification
- Kingdom: Plantae
- Clade: Embryophytes
- Clade: Tracheophytes
- Clade: Spermatophytes
- Clade: Angiosperms
- Clade: Monocots
- Order: Asparagales
- Family: Iridaceae
- Genus: Dietes
- Species: D. grandiflora

Binomial name
- Dietes grandiflora N.E.Br.

= Dietes grandiflora =

Species of flowering plant

Dietes grandiflora, commonly named fortnight lily, large wild iris, African iris or fairy iris, is a rhizomatous perennial plant of the Iris Family (Iridaceae) with long, rigid, sword-like green leaves. This species is common in horticulture in its native South Africa, where it is often used in public gardens, beautification of commercial premises and along roadsides.

== Description ==
The blooms are white with yellow and violet markings and can be up to four inches (ten cm) in diameter. Dark markings are found at the base of the outer tepals. These flowers bloom in abundance during summer, especially after rain. They last a couple of days and are followed by 5 cm long green capsules that contain very dark brown seeds, dispersed when the capsule splits open.

== Cultivation ==
Plants prefer dappled shade to full sun where they will flower in profusion, though they will grow in shaded areas (with an accompanying loss of flower production). Under favourable conditions, the clumps multiply rapidly. Dietes grandiflora are drought and frost hardy, making them popular for en masse plantings. They are frequently called "Fortnight Lilies" because they typically bloom for two weeks, followed by two weeks of rest.

== Environmental weed ==
Dietes grandiflora is considered an "environmental weed" in parts of Australia, particularly Western Australia, Queensland, and Lord Howe Island.

== Gallery ==
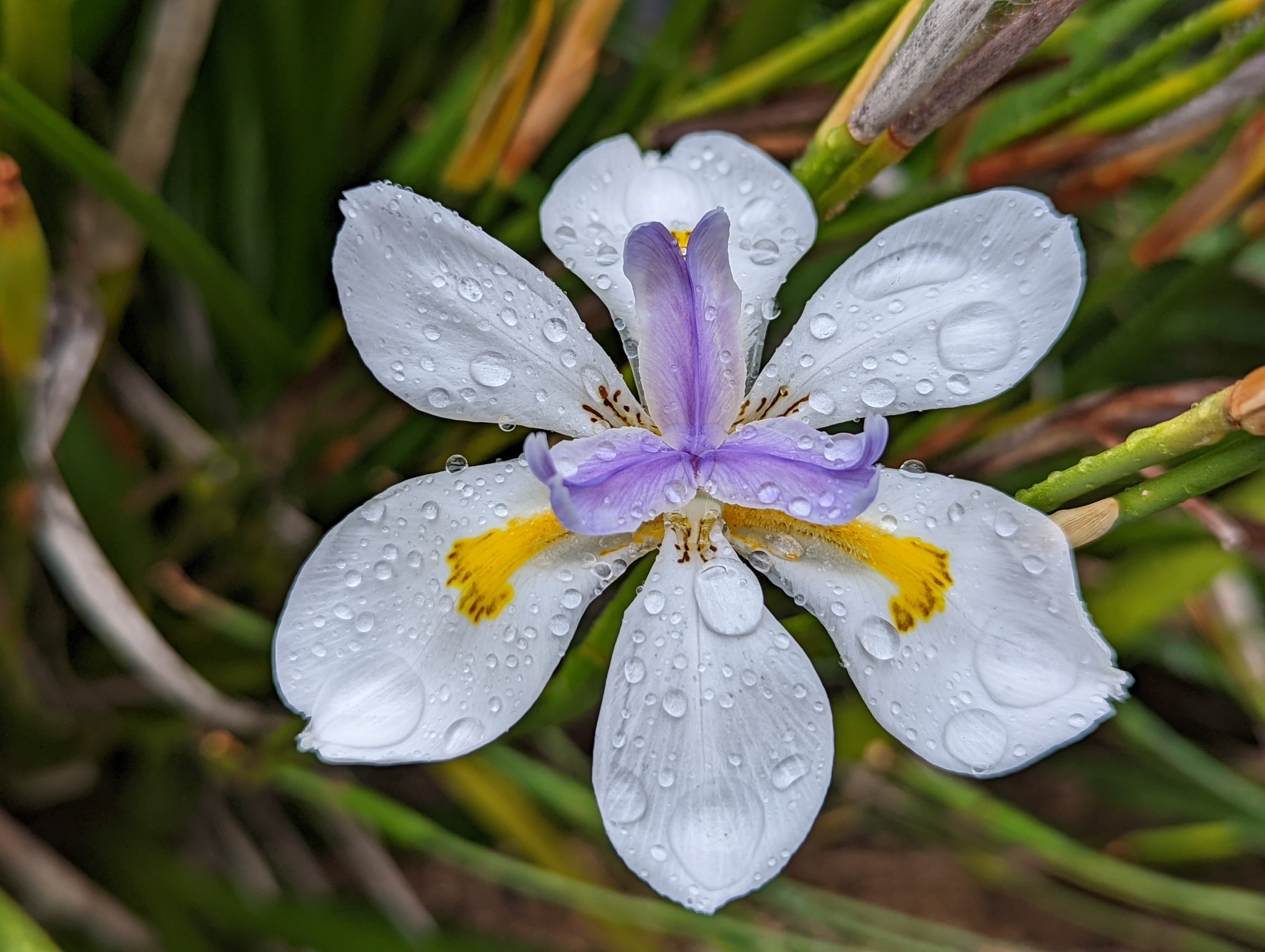
Top view

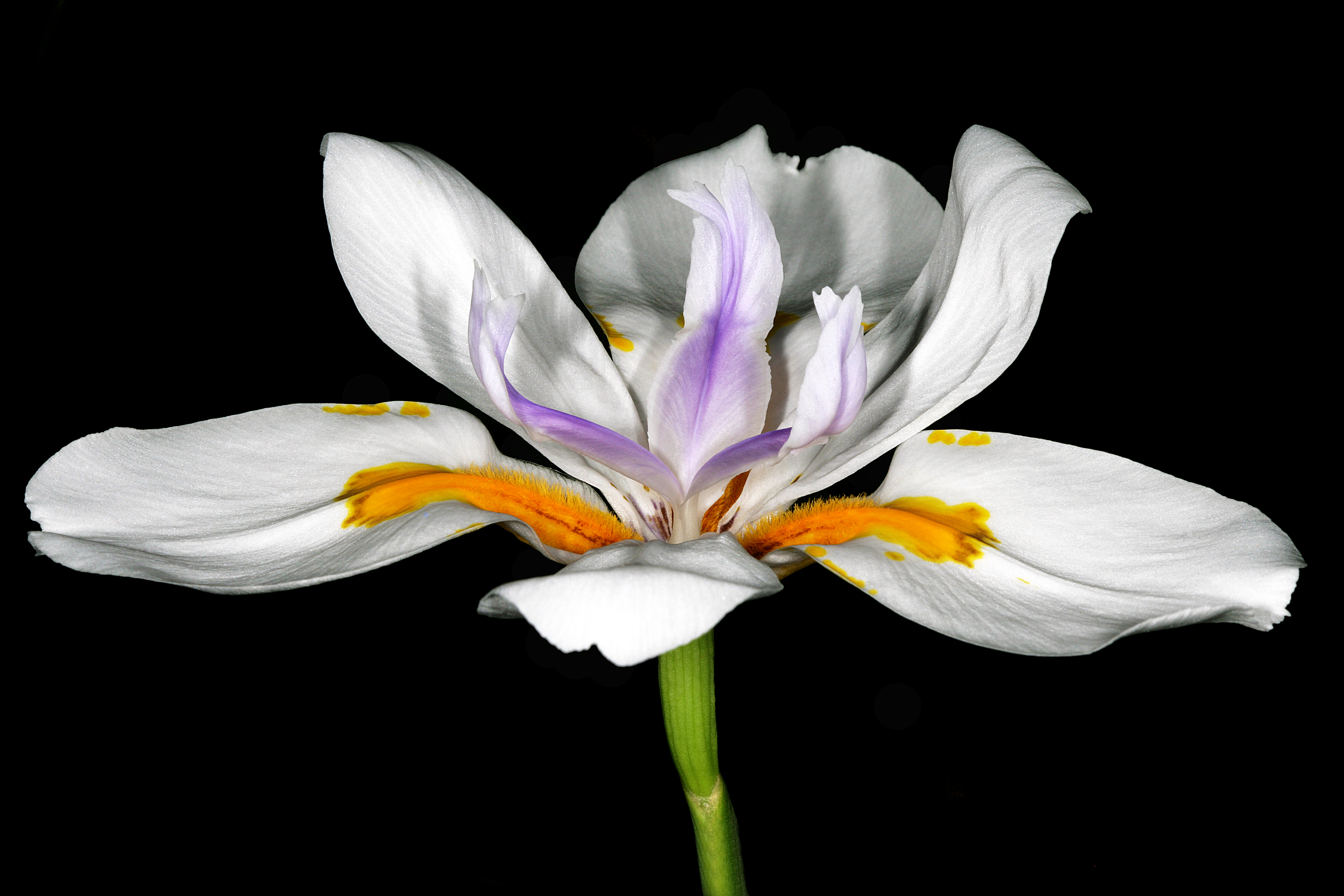
Side view

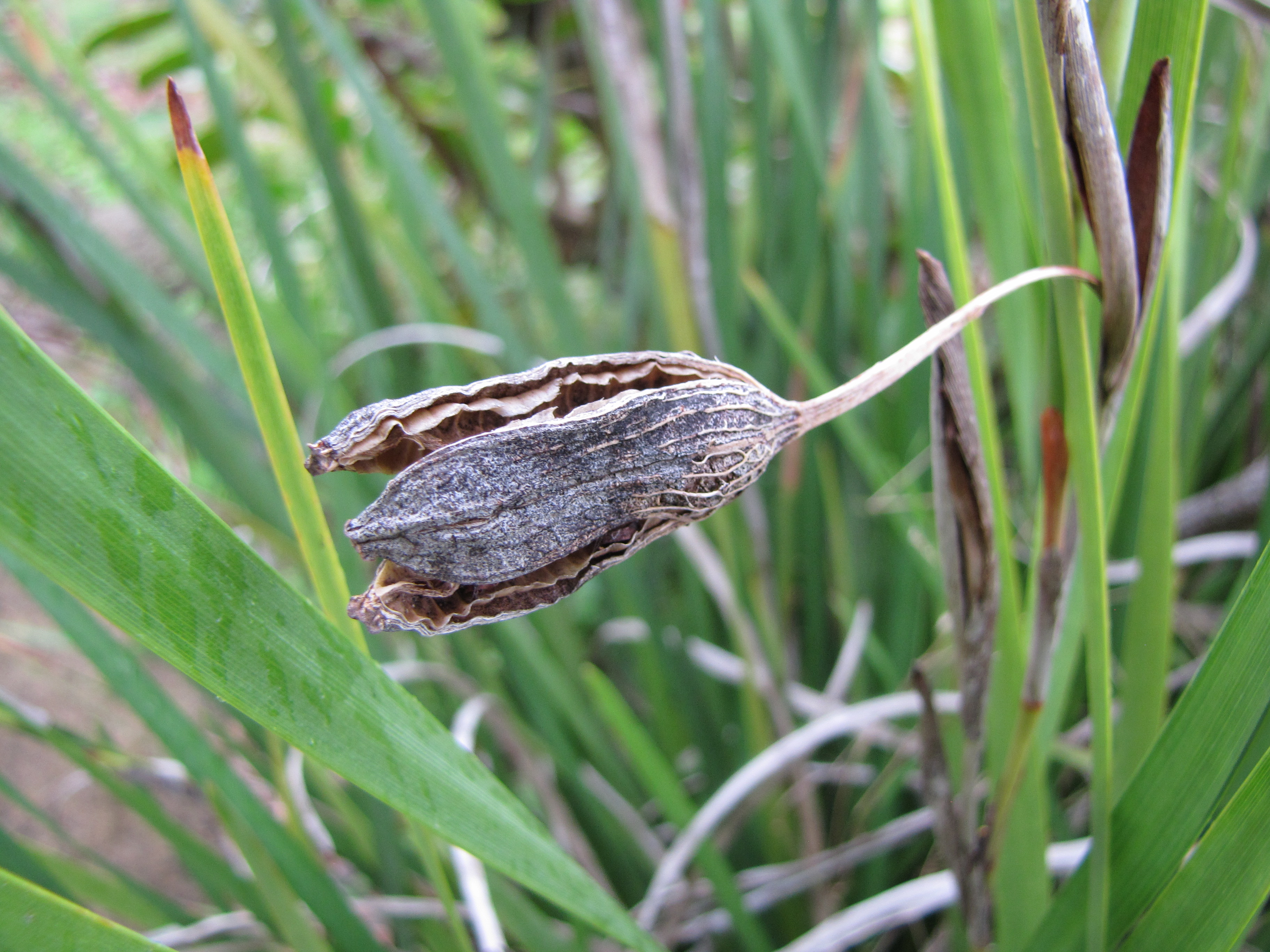
Dry seed capsule

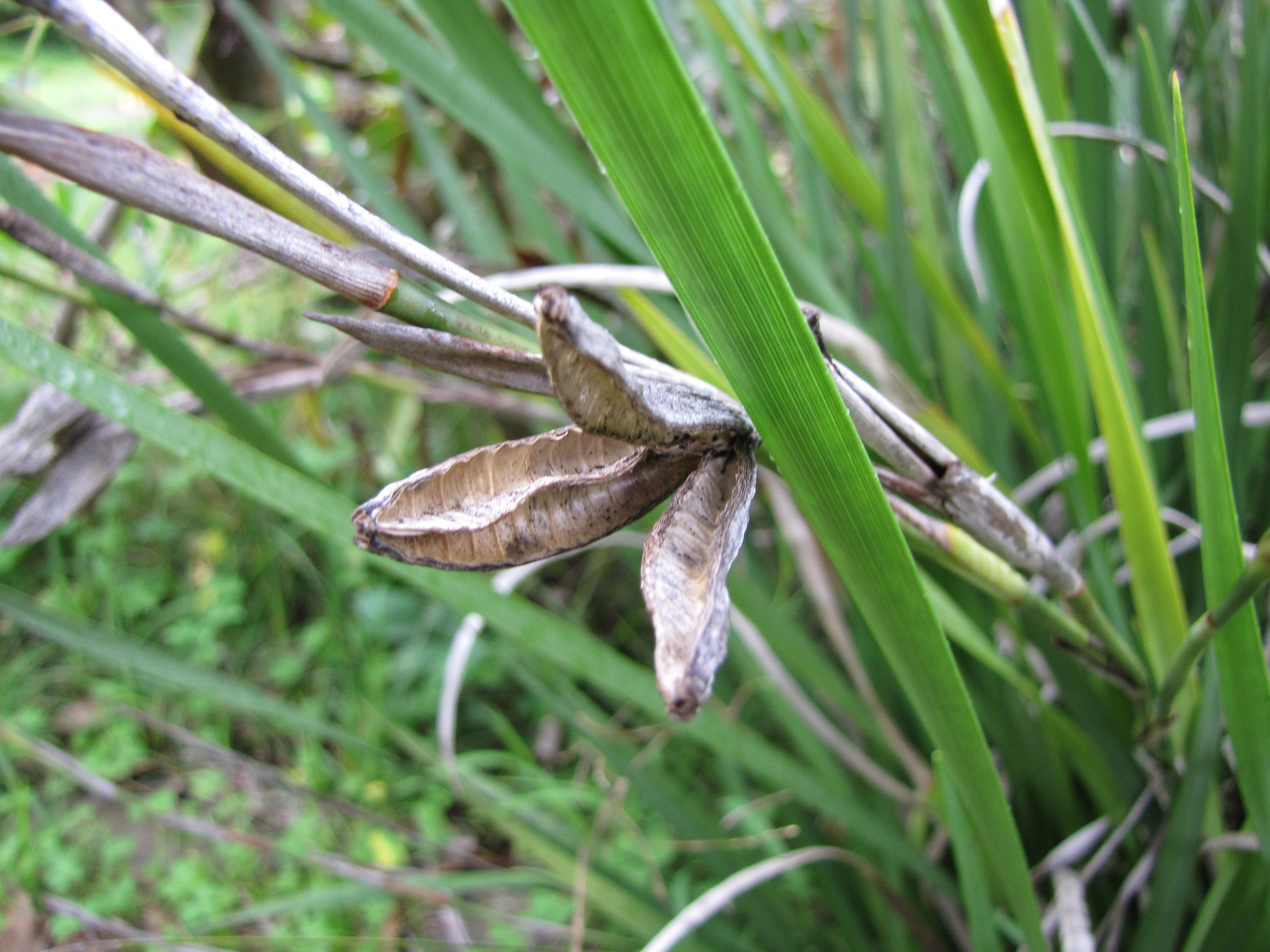
Dry seed capsule

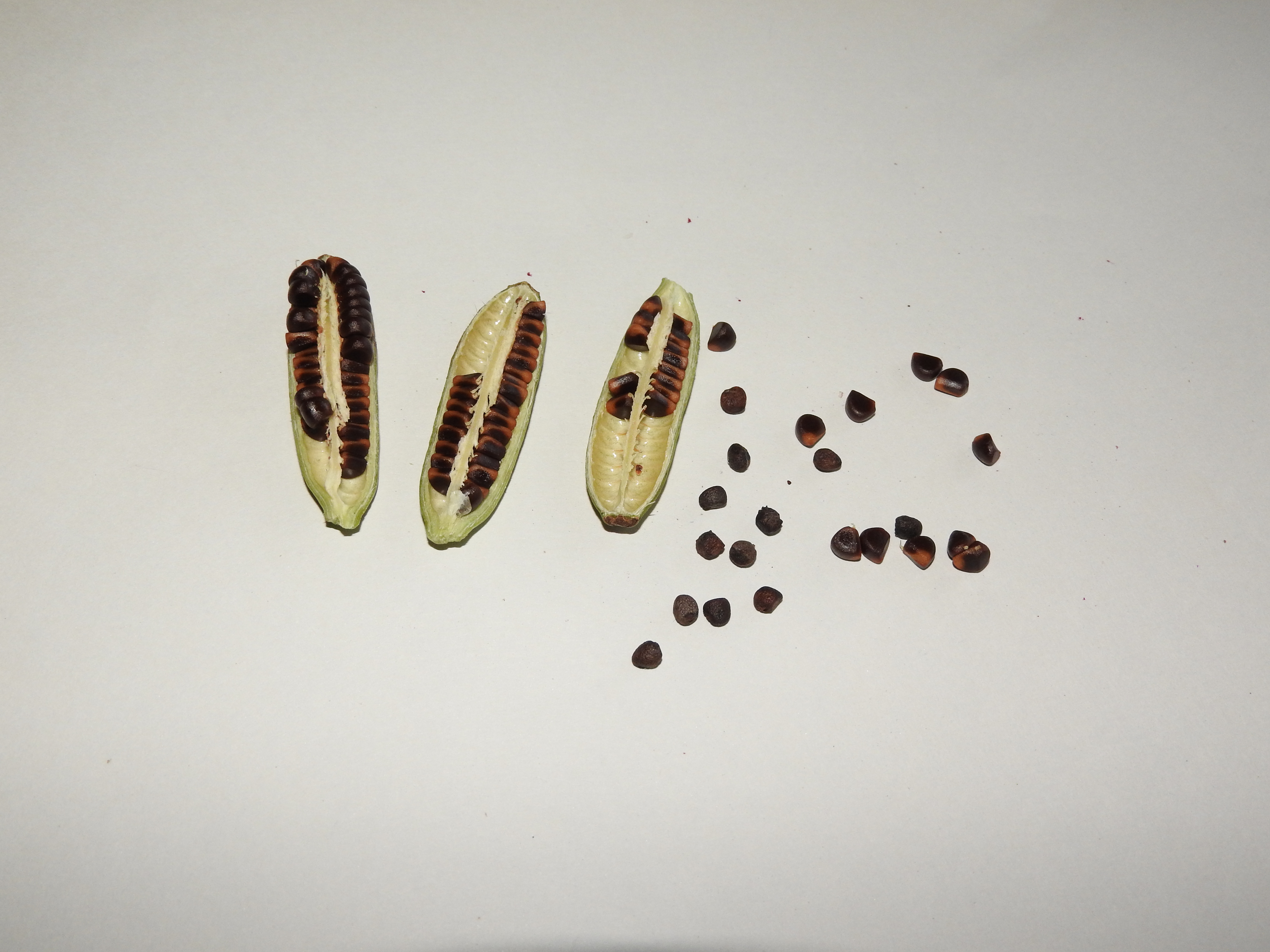
Fresh seed capsule and seeds
