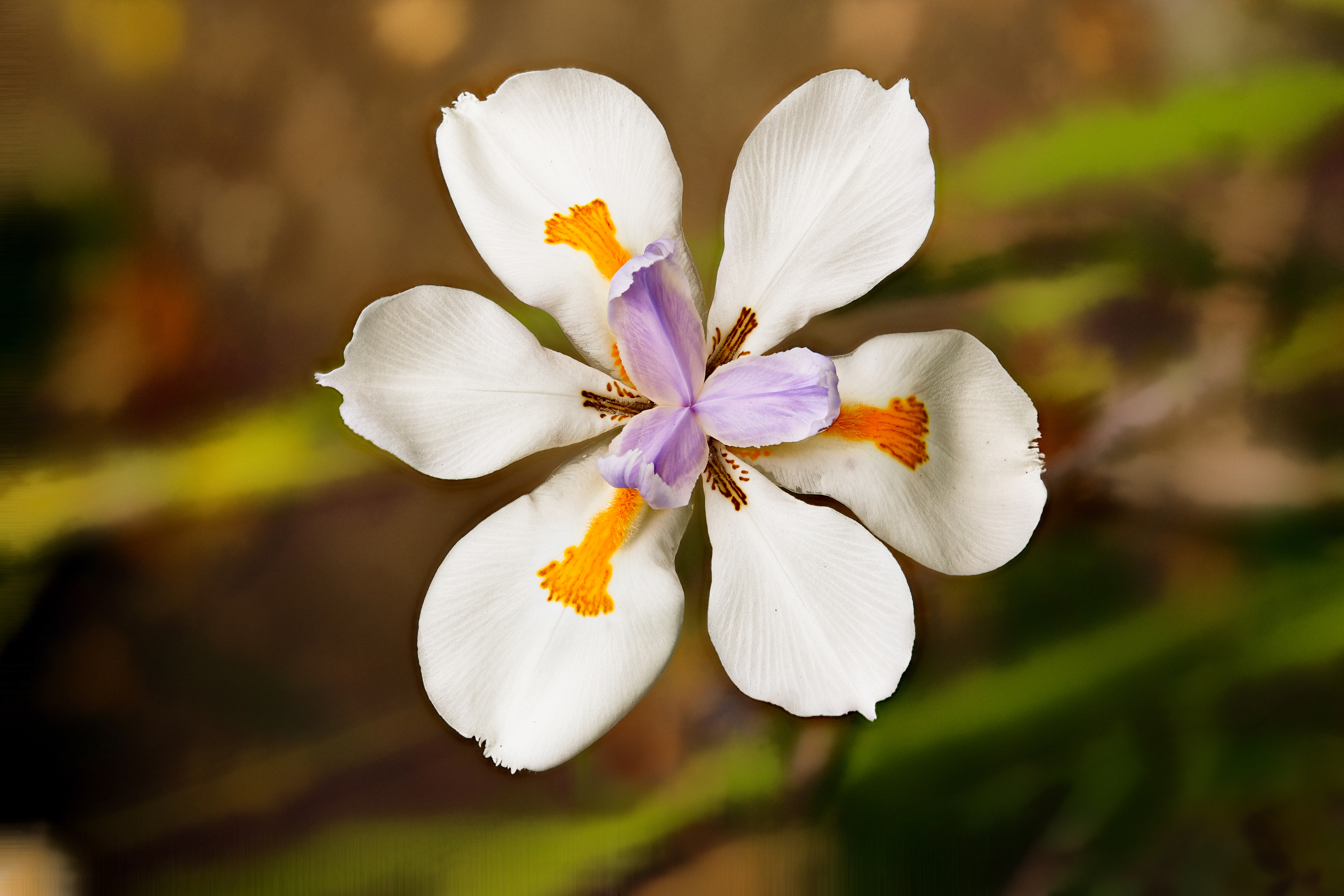

Scientific classification
- Kingdom: Plantae
- Clade: Tracheophytes
- Clade: Angiosperms
- Clade: Monocots
- Order: Asparagales
- Family: Iridaceae
- Genus: Dietes
- Species: D. iridioides

Binomial name
- Dietes iridioides (L.) Sweet

Synonyms
- Dietes vegeta N.E.Br. Moraea iridioides L. Moraea vegeta Mill.

= Dietes iridioides =

Species of flowering plant

Dietes iridioides, commonly named African iris, fortnight lily, and morea iris, is a species of plant in the family Iridaceae that is native to Southern Africa.

== Description ==
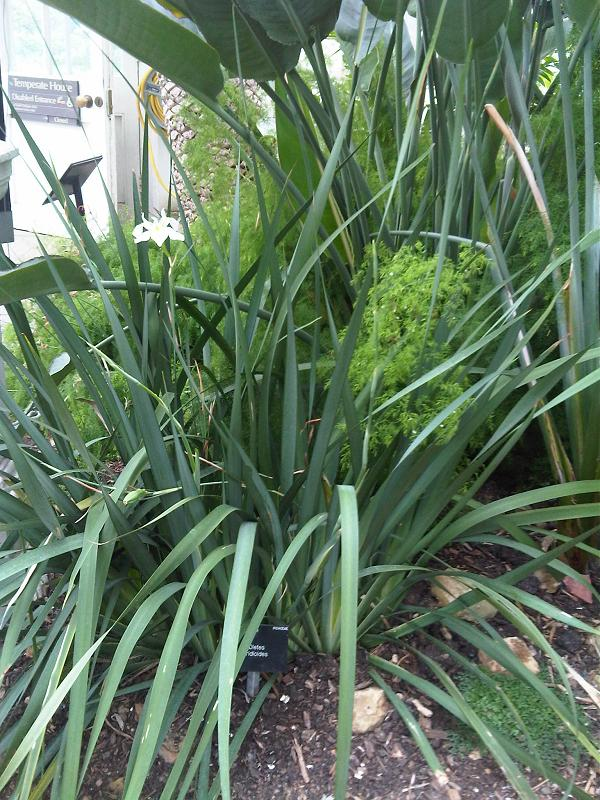
Full view of plant

This species has sarmentous stems with branches bearing lily-like flowers 6–8 centimetres (2.4–3.1 in) wide, white with yellow central markings. Growing up to 60 centimetres (24 in) in height and 30–60 centimetres (12–24 in) in spread, it forms dense basal tufts in the shape of an extended fan. Its preferred habitat is in semi-shade under tall, open trees. It has white flowers marked with yellow and violet, with six free tepals that are not joined into a tube at their bases. These flowers last only for a few days.

The seedpods of the plant often bend the stalks down to the ground where they have a better chance of propagating a new generation of plants.

== Distribution ==
Dietes iridoides is widely distributed in Africa, from Ethiopia to South Africa.

== Taxonomy ==
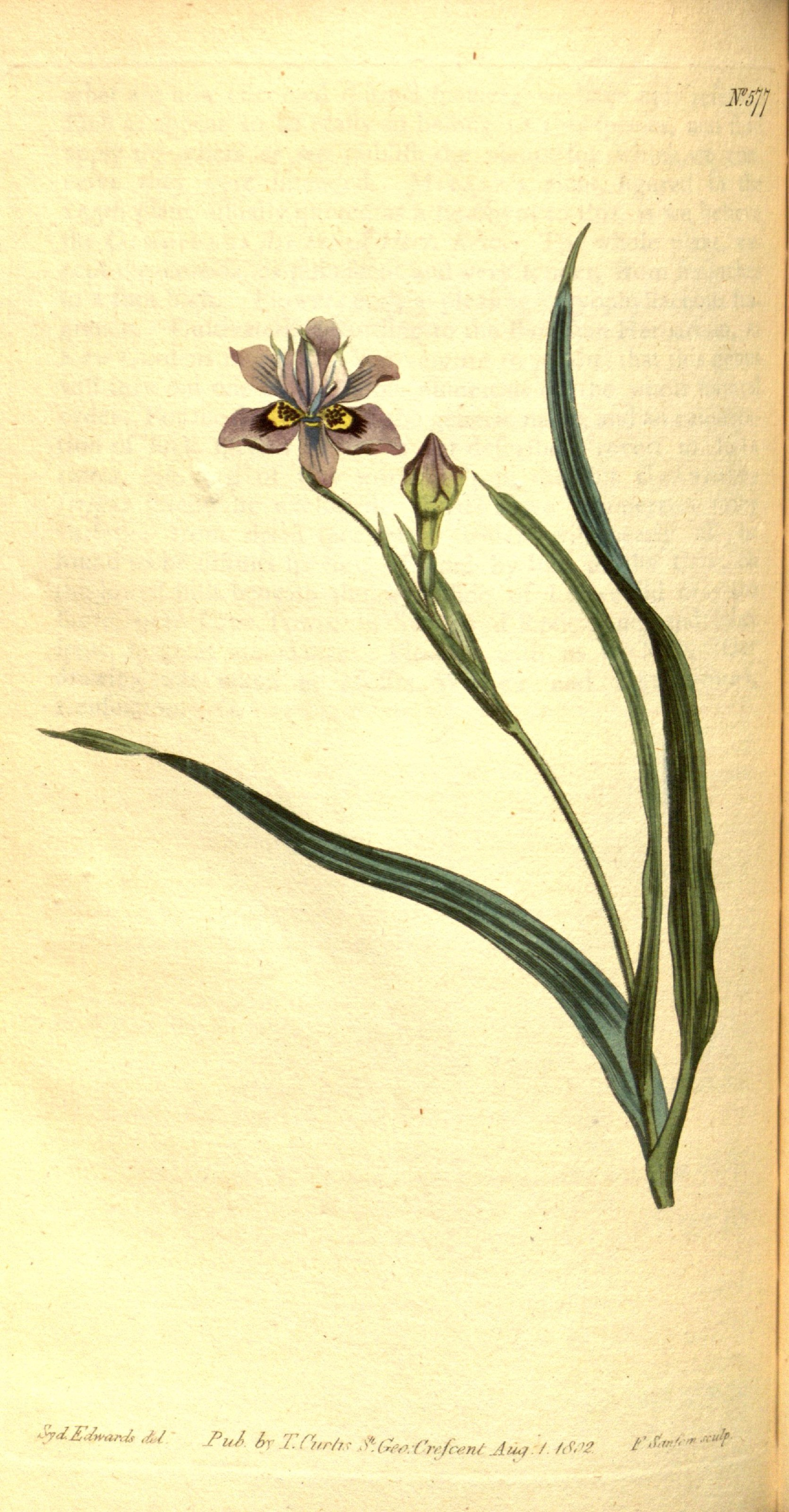
Illustration from 1803

These plants were formerly placed in the genus Moraea, but were reclassified because they are rhizomatous. Some references mention the species Dietes vegeta or D. vegeta variegata, springing from some confusion with Moraea vegata (which grows from a corm, not a rhizome). The name D. vegeta is commonly misapplied to both D. iridioides and D. grandiflora.
