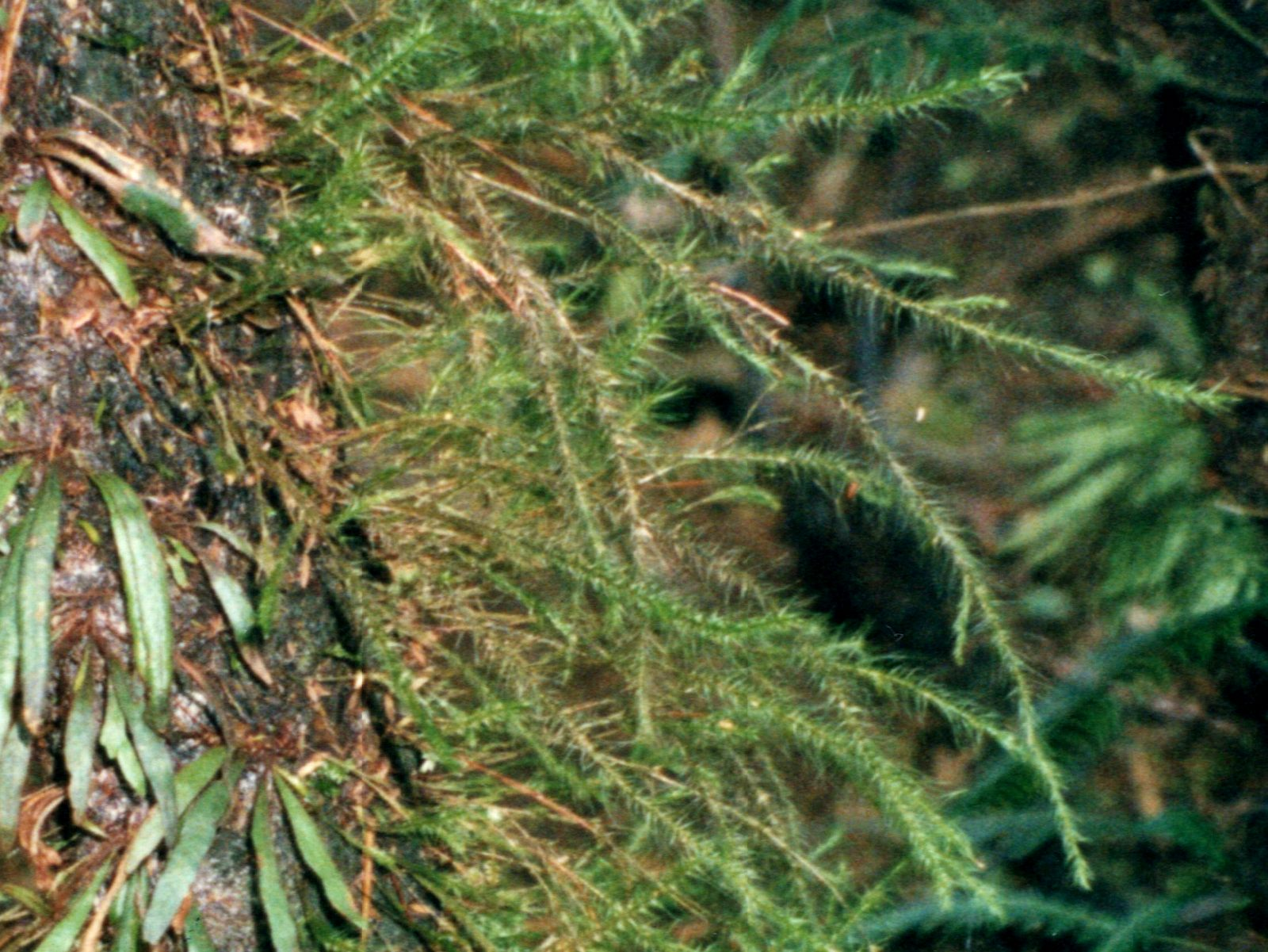

Scientific classification
- Kingdom: Plantae
- Division: Bryophyta
- Class: Bryopsida
- Subclass: Bryidae
- Order: Hypnodendrales
- Family: Hypnodendraceae
- Genus: Spiridens
- Species: S. muelleri

Binomial name
- Spiridens muelleri Hampe

Synonyms
- Spiridens vieillardii Schimp.

= Spiridens muelleri =

Species of moss

Spiridens muelleri is a species of moss found on Lord Howe Island. It is the only member of the genus Spiridens known to occur in Australia.
