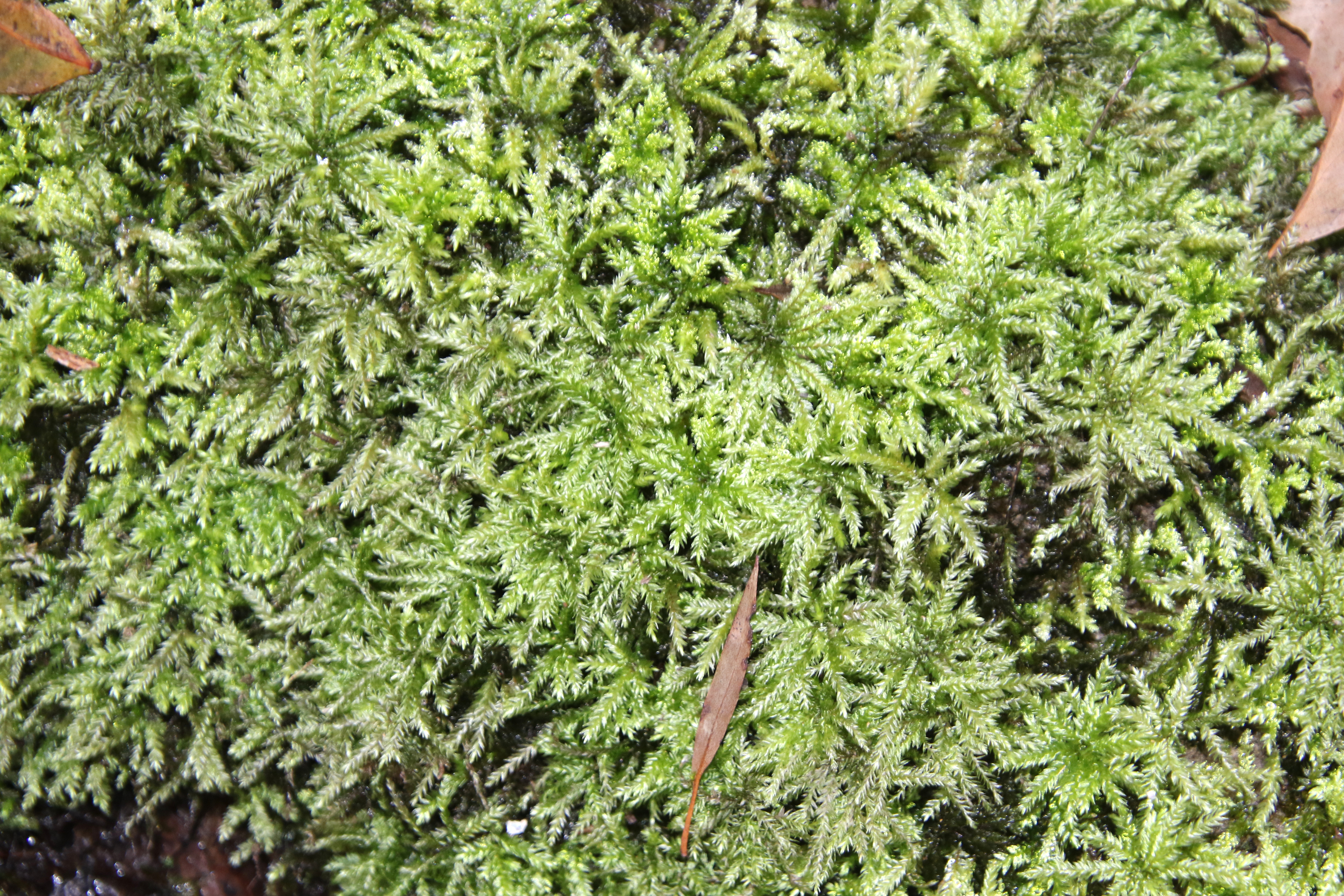
- Garigal National Park, Sydney, Australia

Scientific classification
- Kingdom: Plantae
- Division: Bryophyta
- Class: Bryopsida
- Subclass: Bryidae
- Order: Hypnodendrales
- Family: Hypnodendraceae
- Genus: Hypnodendron
- Species: H. vitiense

Binomial name
- Hypnodendron vitiense Mitt.

Varieties
- Hypnodendron vitiense var. vitiense Hypnodendron vitiense var. australe

= Hypnodendron vitiense =

Palm tree moss

Species of moss

Hypnodendron vitiense Mitt., commonly known as palm moss or palm tree moss, is a pleurocarp moss of which two subspecies are described: Hypnodendron vitiense subsp. vitiense and H. vitiense subsp. australe. The geographic range for the species spans Australia, Asia, and Oceania. The plant is commonly located in shaded wet forests and rainforests near water sources.

The two subspecies, however, are weakly recognised and appear to intergrade in north-eastern Queensland collections that are somewhat depauperate and in poor condition. Hypnodendron vitiense subsp. vitiense is more common in central and eastern Malesia, Melanesia and Polynesia and H. vitiense subsp. australe Touw is endemic to Australia occurring in Queensland, New South Wales, Australian Capital Territory, Victoria and Tasmania.

== See also ==
- Hypnodendron comosum
