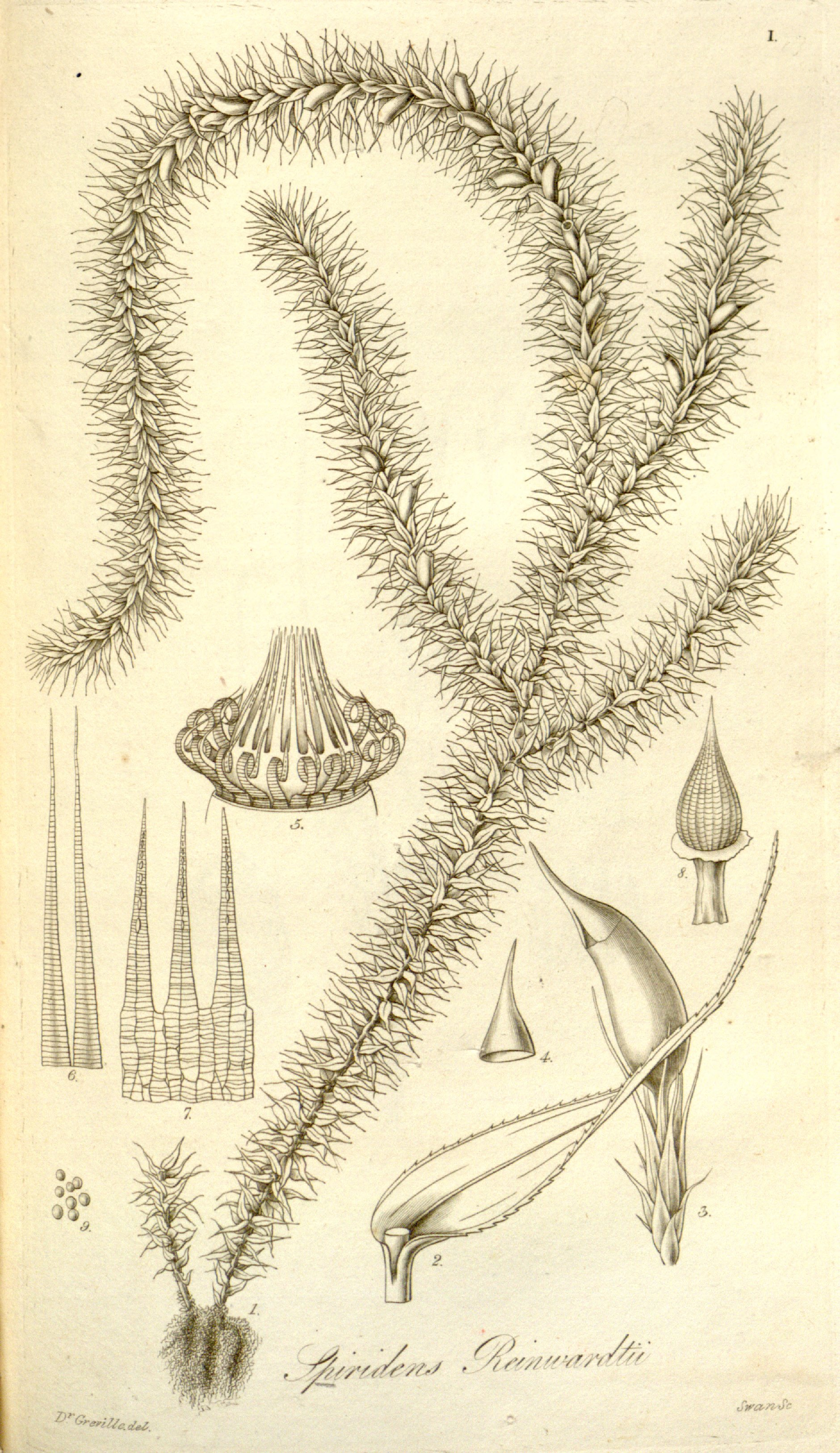
- Illustration by Dr. Greville

Scientific classification
- Kingdom: Plantae
- Division: Bryophyta
- Class: Bryopsida
- Subclass: Bryidae
- Order: Hypnodendrales
- Family: Hypnodendraceae
- Genus: Spiridens
- Species: S. reinwardtii

Binomial name
- Spiridens reinwardtii Nees

Synonyms
- Neckera balfouriana; Spiridens balfourianus Greville 1848

= Spiridens reinwardtii =

Species of moss

Spiridens reinwardtii is a species of moss with a wide distribution. It may be found in Australia, Taiwan, French Polynesia, India, Indonesia, Malaysia, New Caledonia, Papua New Guinea, Philippines and possibly other countries. This forest moss is known for its climbing vine-like habit, it grows up tree trunks and also sends out horizontal and branched shoots. Spiridens reinwardtii may reach 3 metres long.
