= Mniodendron =

Scientific classification
- Kingdom: Plantae
- Division: Bryophyta
- Class: Bryopsida
- Subclass: Bryidae
- Order: Hypnodendrales
- Family: Hypnodendraceae
- Genus: Mniodendron; Lindb.

Genus of moss

Mniodendron is a genus of mosses in the Hypnodendraceae family. It can be differentiated from other members of the family by its densely tomentose stipes and narrowly tapering leaves, which lend a fuzzy appearance to the plants.

== Species ==
The following species are assigned to this genus:

- Mniodendron camptotheca Duby ex Besch.
- Mniodendron camptotheca Duby ex Paris
- Mniodendron colensoi (Hook.f. & Wilson) Besch.
- Mniodendron comatulum Geh. ex Broth. & Watts
- Mniodendron comatum (Müll.Hal.) Lindb.
- Mniodendron comosum (Labill.) Lindb.
- Mniodendron dendroides (Brid.) Wijk & Margad.
- Mniodendron tahiticum Besch.
