= Hypnodendron spininervium =

Scientific classification
- Kingdom: Plantae
- Division: Bryophyta
- Class: Bryopsida
- Subclass: Bryidae
- Order: Hypnodendrales
- Family: Hypnodendraceae
- Genus: Hypnodendron
- Species: H. spininervium

Binomial name
- Hypnodendron spininervium (Hook.) A.Jaeger & Sauerb.

Species of moss

Hypnodendron spininervium is a moss in the family Hypnodendraceae. Like all members of the Hypnodendraceae family, H. spininervium has an umbrella-shaped branching pattern. Some of the key identifying features of H. spininervium are its grooved capsules, a lack of tomentum on its stipe, a lack of a leaf border, and the lack of hairpoints on its leaves. Hypnodendron spininervium is widespread across Aotearoa, and also occurs in Australia. It occurs most frequently in forests at relatively low elevations.
