= Robert Braithwaite (bryologist) =

British bryologist (1824–1917)

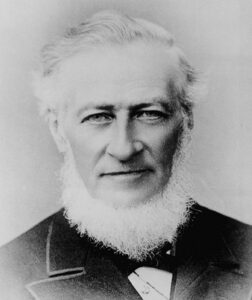
Robert Braithwaite

Robert Braithwaite FLS FRMS (10 May 1824 – 20 October 1917) was an English bryologist. He worked professionally as a general practitioner. He married Charlotte Elizabeth, daughter of Nathaniel Bagshaw Ward, who influenced him. His best known contributions to bryology were his 3-volume The British Moss-Flora (1887–1905). He served as President of the Quekett Microscopical Club from 1872 to 1873. In 1877 Braithwaite edited the exsiccata-like series Sphagnaceae Britannicae exsiccatae, edidit R. Braithwaite.

He was honoured in Braithwaitea Lindb. in 1872 (from the Hypnodendraceae family) which was published in Acta Soc. Sci. Fenn. Vol.10: on page 250 in 1872.
