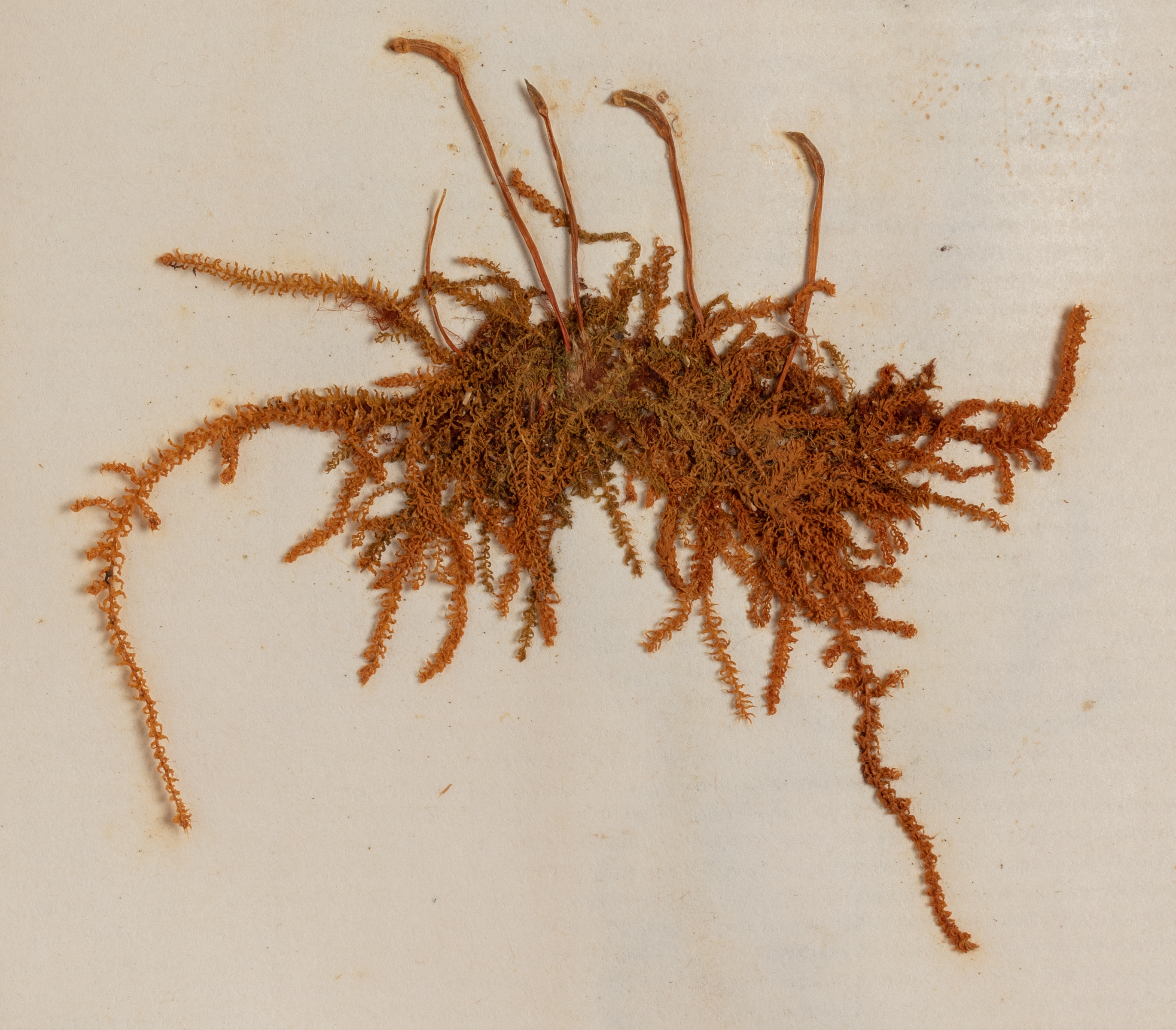
- Racopilum strumiferum

Scientific classification
- Kingdom: Plantae
- Division: Bryophyta
- Class: Bryopsida
- Subclass: Bryidae
- Order: Hypnodendrales
- Family: Racopilaceae
- Genus: Racopilum; P.Beauv.

Synonyms
- Rhacopilum Palisot de Beauvois, 1805

= Racopilum =

Genus of mosses

Racopilum is a genus of mosses belonging to the family Racopilaceae.

The species of this genus are found in Southern Hemisphere.

The genus name of Racopilum refers to the combination of two Greek words; rhakos meaning rag or remnant, and also pilos meaning felt cap, which alludes to basally torn calyptra (cap-like structure) of some taxa.

== Species ==
As accepted by GBIF;

- Racopilum africanum Mitten, 1863
- Racopilum angustistipulaceum C.Müller, 1876
- Racopilum angustistipulaceum Müll.Hal.
- Racopilum anomalum Schwägr.
- Racopilum arcuatum (Hedw.) A.Jaeger
- Racopilum aristatum Mitten, 1864
- Racopilum aubertii P.Beauv.
- Racopilum ayresii Mitten, 1886
- Racopilum brevipes C.Müller ex Brotherus, 1894
- Racopilum buettneri Brotherus, 1894
- Racopilum capense C.Müller ex Brotherus, 1894
- Racopilum cardotii Renauld, 1898
- Racopilum chevalieri Thériot, 1912
- Racopilum convolutaceum (Müll.Hal.) Reichardt
- Racopilum crassicuspidatum Thériot & Corbière, 1912
- Racopilum crinitum Hampe, 1870
- Racopilum cuspidigerum Ångström, 1872
  - Racopilum cuspidigerum var. convolutaceum (Müll.Hal.) Zanten & Dijkstra
- Racopilum ellipticum Renauld, 1898
- Racopilum epiphyllosum Fleischer, 1923
- Racopilum fernandezianum Cardot, 1921
- Racopilum ferriei Thériot, 1907
- Racopilum floridae Herzog, 1916
- Racopilum francii Thériot, 1921
- Racopilum gracile Mitten, 1885
- Racopilum gracillimum C.Müller, 1896
- Racopilum gracillimum Müll.Hal.
- Racopilum integrum Dixon
- Racopilum intermedium Hampe, 1863
- Racopilum laxirete Brotherus, 1928
- Racopilum leptocarpum Wilson, 1854
- Racopilum leptotapes C.Müller ex Cardot, 1915
- Racopilum macrocarpum Brotherus, 1910
- Racopilum madagassum Renauld, 1898
- Racopilum magnirete E.B.Bartram, 1944
- Racopilum marginatum Dixon, 1918
- Racopilum mauritianum C.Müller ex Bescherelle, 1880
- Racopilum microdictyon Bescherelle, 1885
- Racopilum microides Fleischer ex Dixon, 1932
- Racopilum microphyllum Bescherelle, 1894
- Racopilum mougeotianum Jaeger, 1876
- Racopilum mucronatum (P.Beauv.) Mitt.
- Racopilum naumannii C.Müller, 1883
- Racopilum niutense H.Akiy. & Zanten
- Racopilum niutensis H.Akiyama & Zanten, 1999
- Racopilum ornithopodioides (Brid.) Lindb.
- Racopilum orthocarpioides Brotherus, 1890
- Racopilum orthocarpum Wilson ex Mitt.
- Racopilum pacificum Bescherelle, 1898
- Racopilum pectinatum C.Müller, 1875
- Racopilum pectinatum Müll.Hal.
- Racopilum penzigii C.Müller ex Brizi, 1893
- Racopilum perrieri Thériot, 1920
- Racopilum plicatum Renauld & Cardot, 1891
- Racopilum polythrincium Spruce ex Mitten, 1869
- Racopilum purpurascens Hampe, 1876
- Racopilum robustum J.D.Hooker & Wilson, 1854
- Racopilum schmidii (Müll.Hal.) Mitt.
- Racopilum siamense Dixon, 1932
- Racopilum spectabile Reinwardt & Hornschuch, 1829
- Racopilum speluncae C.Müller, 1875
- Racopilum speluncae Müll.Hal.
- Racopilum squarrifolium T.Koponen & Norris, 1985
- Racopilum strumiferum Mitten, 1859
- Racopilum thomeanum Brotherus, 1890
- Racopilum tomentosum Bridel, 1827
- Racopilum tubiforme Zanten
- Racopilum ugandae Dixon, 1918
- Racopilum verrucosum Herzog, 1916
