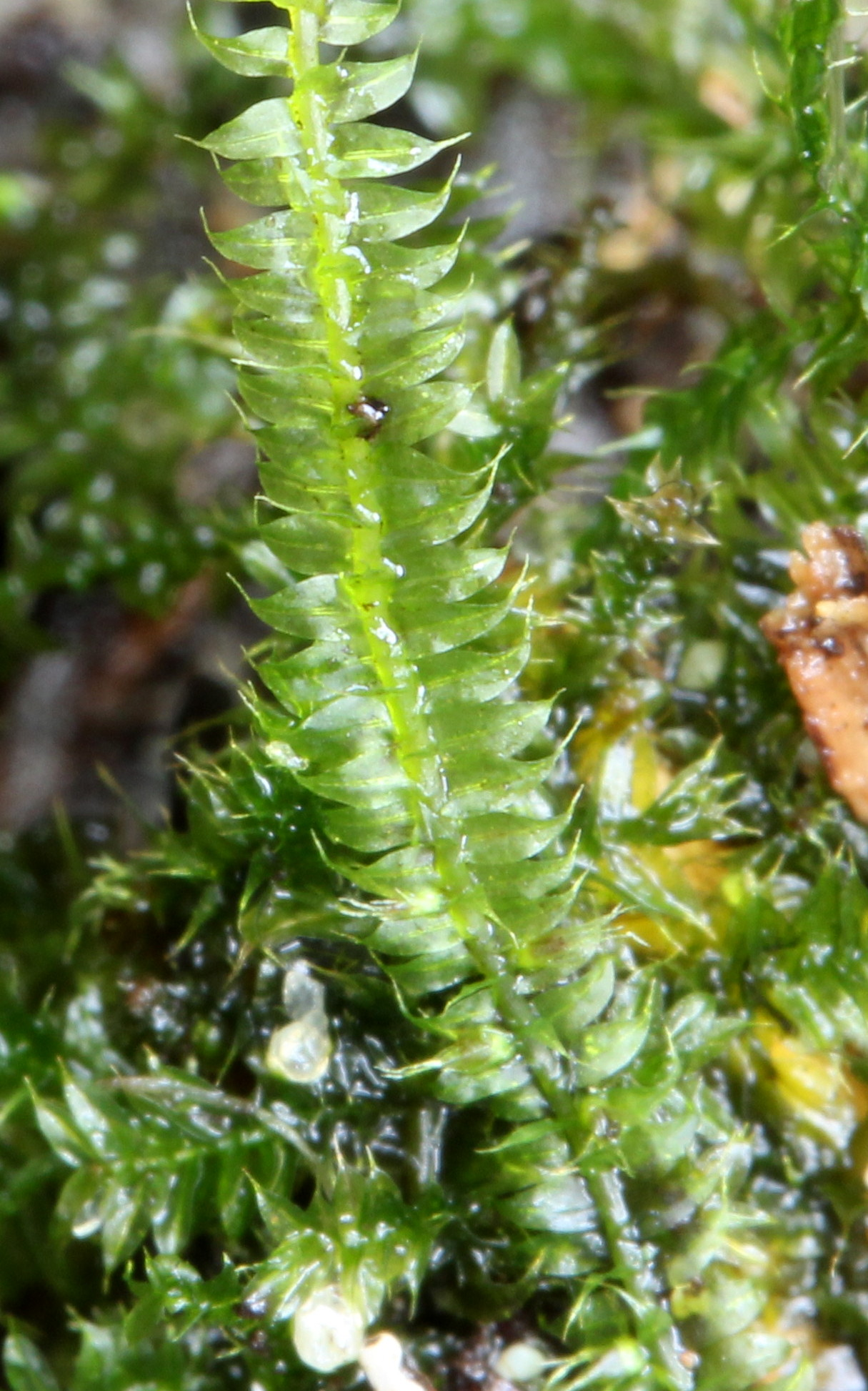
- Racopilum cuspidigerum in Sydney, Australia

Scientific classification
- Kingdom: Plantae
- Division: Bryophyta
- Class: Bryopsida
- Subclass: Bryidae
- Order: Hypnodendrales
- Family: Racopilaceae
- Genus: Racopilum
- Species: R. cuspidigerum

Binomial name
- Racopilum cuspidigerum (Schwägr.) Ångström

Synonyms
- Racopilum schmidii (Müll. Hal.) Mitt.

= Racopilum cuspidigerum =

Species of moss

Racopilum cuspidigerum is a moss with a widespread distribution. It is found in Australia, New Zealand, Papua New Guinea, Philippines, Malesia and Oceania.

It also has a variety, Racopilum cuspidigerum var. convolutaceum (Müll.Hal.) Zanten & Dijkstra It is widespread in New Zealand and found in forests on rotting wood, bark, soil and rock.
