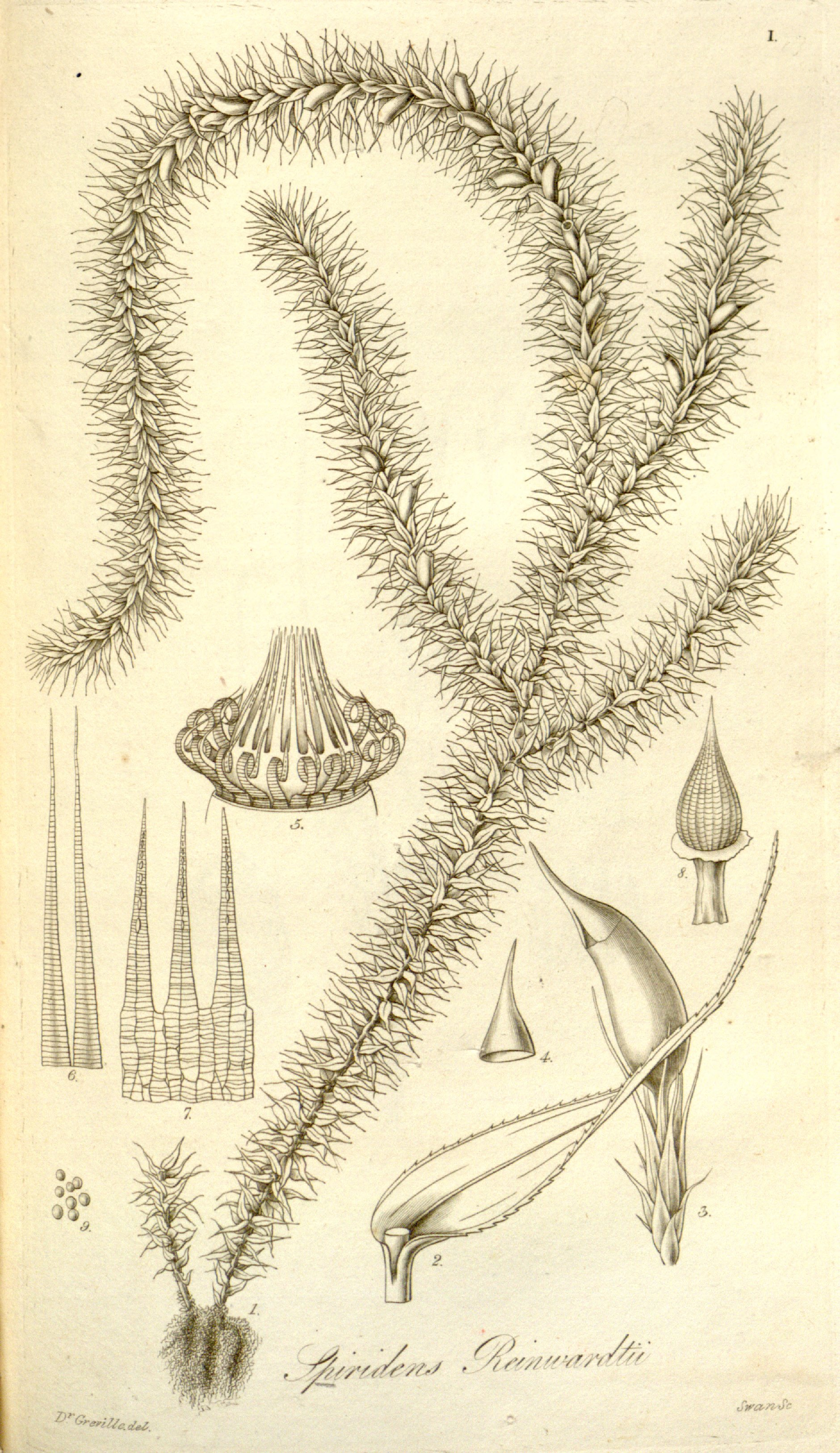
- Spiridens reinwardtii

Scientific classification
- Kingdom: Plantae
- Division: Bryophyta
- Class: Bryopsida
- Subclass: Bryidae
- Order: Hypnodendrales
- Family: Hypnodendraceae
- Genus: Spiridens; Nees

= Spiridens =

Genus of mosses

Spiridens is a genus of mosses belonging to the family Hypnodendraceae.

The species of this genus are found in Southeastern Asia and Australia.

Species:

- Spiridens abietinus (Hook.) Mitt.
- Spiridens aristifolius Mitten, 1868
- Spiridens reinwardtii
