= Sciadocladus =

Scientific classification
- Kingdom: Plantae
- Division: Bryophyta
- Class: Bryopsida
- Subclass: Bryidae
- Order: Hypnodendrales
- Family: Pterobryellaceae
- Genus: Sciadocladus; Kindb.

Genus of moss

Sciadocladus is a moss genus in the Pterobryellaceae family.

== Description ==
Large frondose mosses with pinnate secondary branching. Clearly differentiated stipe and branches, stipe tomentose at base only.

== Taxonomy ==
Sciadocladus has been previously placed in the Hypnodendraceae. However, molecular evidence shows that this genus is more accurately placed in the Pterobryellaceae alongside Pterobryella.

Sciadocladus is a genus of two species known from New Caledonia, the Solomon Islands, and Aotearoa/New Zealand.

Sciadocladus kerrii is endemic to New Zealand, whilst Sciadocladus menziesii is also known from New Caledonia and the Solomon Islands. Sánchez-Ganfornina & Bell (2023) tested a hypothesis that the New Zealand endemic S. kerrii arose from speciation from the New Zealand population of S. menziesii, and New Zealand S. menziesii would therefore be more closely related to S. kerrii than S. menziesii from New Caledonia and the Solomon Islands. However, they rejected this hypothesis and supported the established taxonomy, finding that all S. menziesii formed a strongly supported monophyletic group, sister to S. kerrii.

== Etymology ==
Sciado- means shade and refers here to the parasol-like form of the branches (-cladus).

== Species ==
There are two species assigned to this genus:

- Sciadocladus kerrii (Mitt.) A.Jaeger ex Broth.
- Sciadocladus menziesii (Hook.) A.Jaeger ex Broth.
