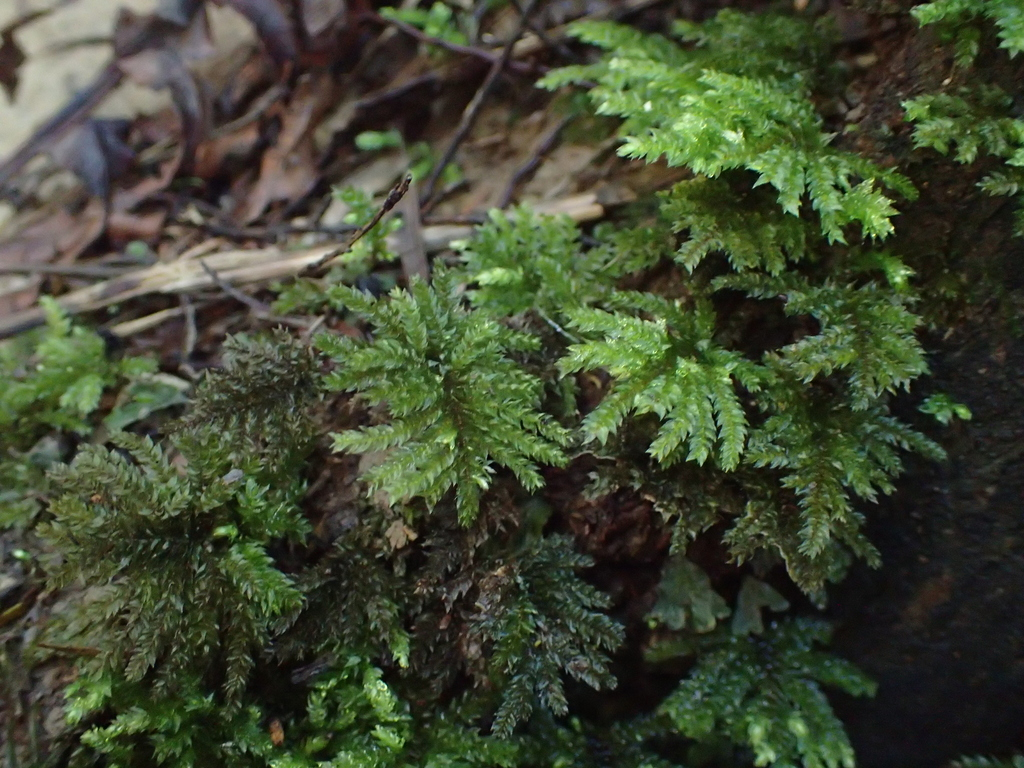
- Hypnodendron arcuatum

Scientific classification
- Kingdom: Plantae
- Division: Bryophyta
- Class: Bryopsida
- Subclass: Bryidae
- Order: Hypnodendrales
- Family: Hypnodendraceae
- Genus: Hypnodendron (Müll.Hal.) Lindb.

= Hypnodendron =

Genus of mosses

Hypnodendron is a genus of mosses belonging to the family Hypnodendraceae.

The following species are recognized in this genus:

- Hypnodendron arcuatum (Hedw.) Lindb.
- Hypnodendron junghuhnii (Müll.Hal.) Lindb.
- Hypnodendron marginatum (Hook.f. & Wilson) Lindb.
- Hypnodendron marginatum (Hook.f. & Wilson) Lindb. ex A.Jaeger & Sauerb.
- Hypnodendron microstictum Mitt.
- Hypnodendron samoanum Mitt.
- Hypnodendron spininervium (Hook.) A.Jaeger & Sauerb.
- Hypnodendron vitiense Mitt.
