= Pterobryellaceae =

Scientific classification
- Kingdom: Plantae
- Clade: Embryophytes
- Division: Bryophyta
- Class: Bryopsida
- Subclass: Bryidae
- Order: Hypnodendrales
- Family: Pterobryellaceae; W.R.Buck & Vitt

Family of mosses

Pterobryellaceae is a family of mosses belonging to the order Hypnodendrales.

== Description ==
Plants in this family are usually very large, with conspicuously pinnate branching and often frondose form.

== Genera ==
There are two genera assigned to this family:

- Pterobryella (Müll. Hal.) A. Jaeger
- Sciadocladus Kindb.
