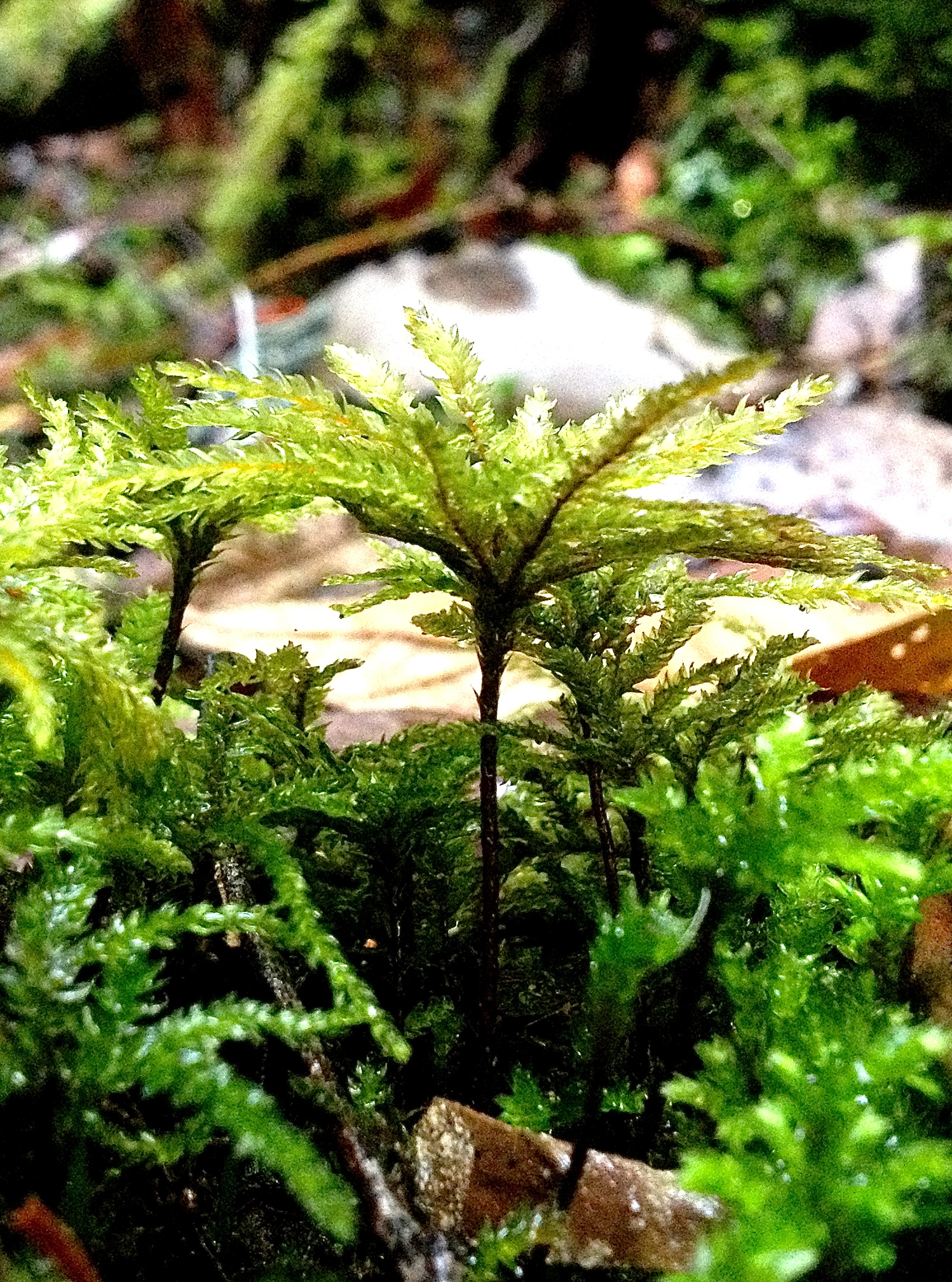

Scientific classification
- Kingdom: Plantae
- Division: Bryophyta
- Class: Bryopsida
- Subclass: Bryidae
- Order: Hypnodendrales
- Family: Hypnodendraceae
- Genus: Hypnodendron
- Species: H. comosum

Binomial name
- Hypnodendron comosum (Labill.) Mitt.

Varieties
- Hypnodendron comosum var. comosum Hypnodendron comosum var. sieberi

= Hypnodendron comosum =

Species of moss

Hypnodendron comosum, commonly known as palm moss or palm tree moss, is a ground moss which can be divided into two varieties: Hypnodendron comosum var. comosum and Hypnodendron comosum var. sieberi. Both Hypnodendron varieties most commonly grow in damp locations in the temperate and tropical rainforests of New South Wales, Victoria, and Tasmania in southern Australia and in New Zealand.

This "miniature forest" dendroid species is viewed by David Meagher and Bruce Fuhrer in their publication A Field Guide to the Mosses and Allied Plants of Southern Australia as one of the most beautiful and unique species of mosses in the southern region of Australia. While both varieties are extremely similar, they are easily identified by their elevation above other moss and lichen species within their ecosystem. Positioned atop an erect stem, the branches form an umbrella shape, the source of the common name "palm tree moss".

== Appearance ==
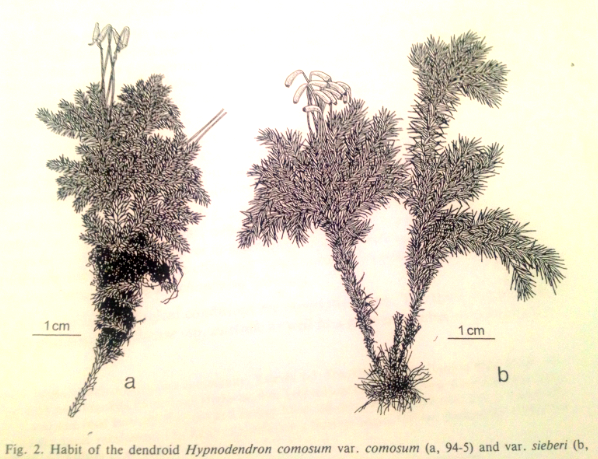
Hypnodendron comosum var.comosum (left) and Hypnodendron comosum var. sieberi (right)

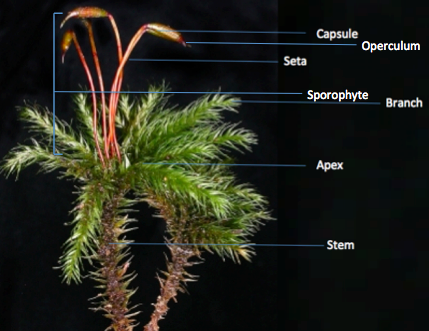
Labeled features of Hypnodendron comosum var. sieberi

The appearance for both varieties is similar with both sharing many of the same features. Resembling the trunk of the tree, the stems are elongated and narrow growing between 2–9 cm (0.79–3.54 in) in length. They are black or brown in colour and covered in trichome hairs and small leaves. The stem reaches up to a green umbrella shaped arrangement of fronds at the top. The horizontally spreading fronds are shaped umbellate to pinnate and grow up to 5 cm (2.0 in) in diameter. Each spreading frond forms many small branches each reaching 2–5 mm (0.079–0.197 in) in length. This gives the umbrella shape a clumpy, palm-like look. The branch leaves are triangular-ovate and yellow-green in colour. The costa is green or brown and margins are serrate toward the tip. The sporophyte arises from the centre of the female gametophyte and forms a long seta on which a capsule is borne. H. comosum bares anywhere between 4–12 sporophytes. The seta is long and thin and reaches between 2–4 cm (0.79–1.57 in) in length. The capsule is orange or brown in colour and reaches around 2–5 mm (0.079–0.197 in) in length. They are cylindrical in shape. The operculum is the cap or covering to the spores, and once this falls off, the spores are passively dispersed via the peristome. While both species are similar, Hypnodendron comosum var. comosum is unique in that it is the smaller, more compact of the two. Most commonly located in Tasmania, its branches are compactly arranged, making this variety seem clumped and tightly packed. Located on mainland Australia, Hypnodendron comosum var. siberi is taller in form and the branches are much more loosely arranged.

== Physiology ==
Like all bryophyte species, Hypnodendron species are non-vascular, meaning the vasculature or ducts within the tissues in which water, nutrients and sugars are transported around the plant are non-existent. Bryophytes also lack true roots but are anchored to the substrate by rhizoids. Unlike vascular plants that use their roots to exchange gas and extract nutrients and water from the soil, bryophytes are able to do this over the leaf surface, depositing nutrients and water where they are required.

== Habitat ==
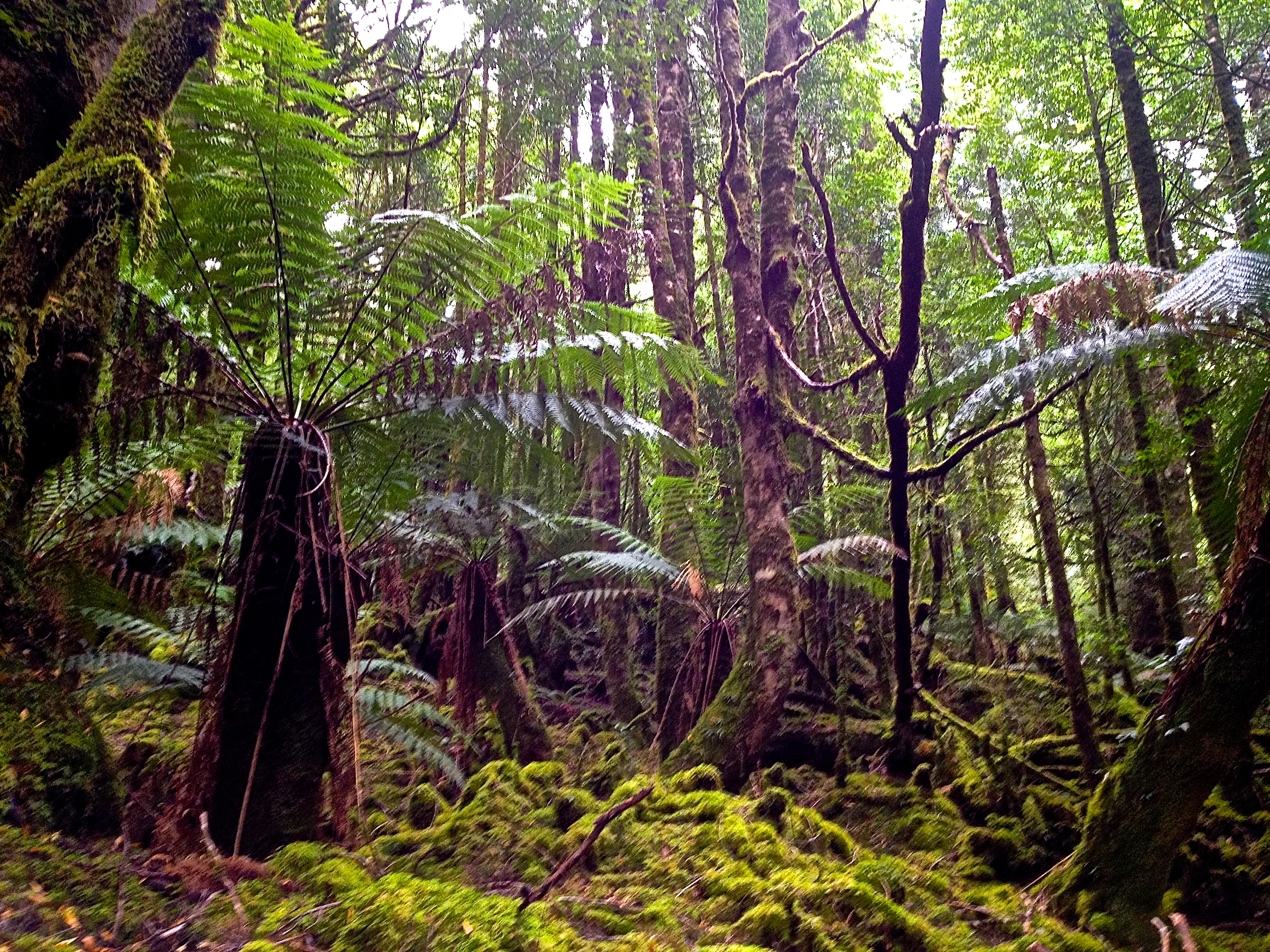
This image shows the filtered amounts of light, distribution and other communities of moss and the different levels of understory. This is a rainforest located in Tasmania.

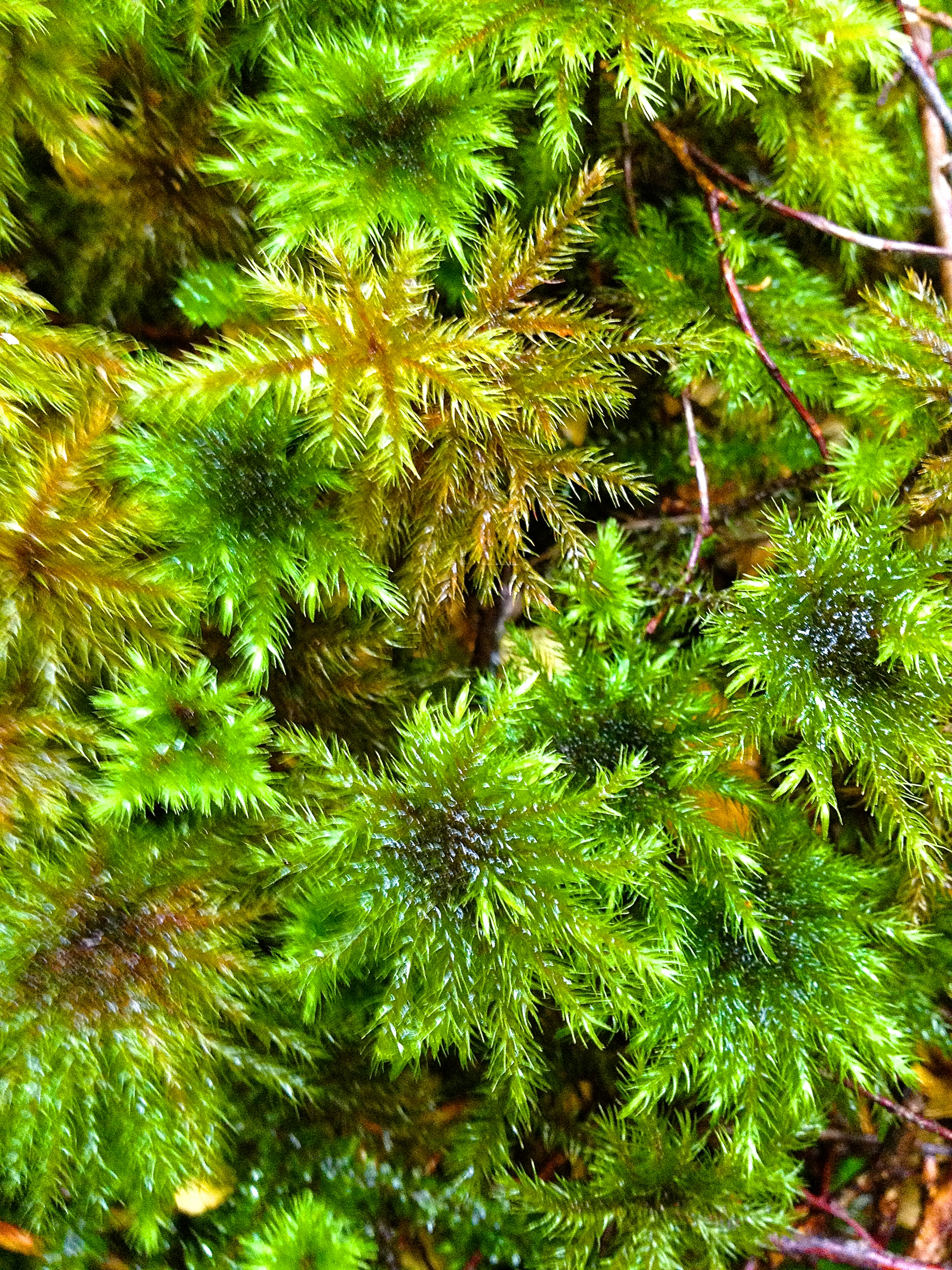
Hypnodendron comosum community taken in Tasmania's wilderness

The plant is commonly located in wet forests and rainforests consisting of moist humeric layerings with loamy soil composition. Favouring wet rocks, tree roots, the base of live trees and tree ferns, it is most commonly located in areas with large amounts of decaying logs and decomposing matter. This species forms clumps like colonizing patterns in dry conditions and, when conditions are moist, H. comosum forms small forest mats with large numbers, indicating wetter environments are preferable.

== Geographical distribution ==
Hypnodendron comosum is endemic to the Australian states of New South wales, Victoria, and Tasmania and to New Zealand, Stuart Island, and the Campbell Islands.

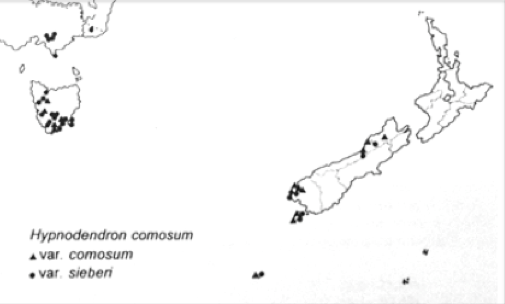
Distribution of both varieties of Hypnodendron comosum, H. c. var. comosum and H. c. var. sieberi

Since it is located in New Zealand as well as Australia, this indicates that the species predates Gondwanaland, suggesting that this species may be included as one of the earliest species to diverge from water to land and may give vital insight toward how vascular plants evolved. Hypnodendron comosum var. sieberi is more commonly located on mainland Australia and the northern South Island of New Zealand, whereas H. c. var. comosum is more commonly located in Tasmania, the southern South Island of New Zealand, and the islands located in the southern ocean.

== Phylogeny ==
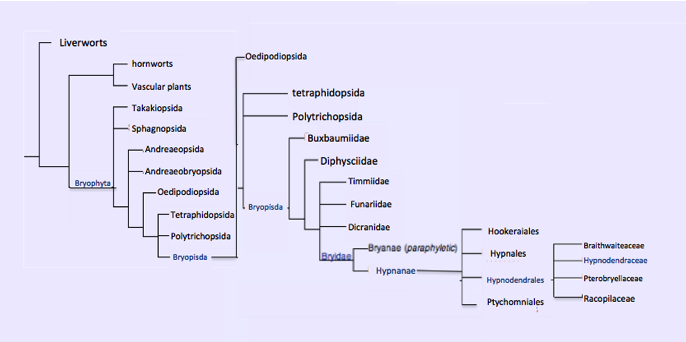
Phylogenetic tree of Hypnodendron comosum

== Life cycle ==
Like all mosses, Hypnodendron comosum has an alternation of generations. This means that there are two generations that exist in a full life cycle of this plant. Those generations are named the sporophyte stage and the gametophyte stage. The gametophyte stage is the fertilization event of the lifecycle and involves female and male gametangia. In this stage the antheridium fertilizes the haploid egg within the archegonia with haploid sperm producing a diploid zygote. This zygote then divides via mitosis and forms the sporophyte. The sporophyte stage is the spore-forming event of the lifecycle. Once the zygote has begun to enlarge, the seta elongates and develops a sporangium on the end in the form of a capsule. This capsule consists of sporogenous tissue, a peristome to regulate the dispersal of spores, and an operculum to protect early release. Once spores are released, they germinate and grow into a narrow long rhizoid-like form named a protonema. This protonema develops buds which grow to become either a male or female gametophyte. The male gametophyte is named the antheridium and the female the archegonium. This is the gametophyte stage.
