= Braithwaitea =

Scientific classification
- Kingdom: Plantae
- Clade: Embryophytes
- Division: Bryophyta
- Class: Bryopsida
- Subclass: Bryidae
- Order: Hypnodendrales
- Family: Braithwaiteaceae; N.E.Bell, A.E.Newton & D.Quandt
- Genus: Braithwaitea; Lindb.
- Species: B. sulcata

Binomial name
- Braithwaitea sulcata (Hook.) A.Jaeger & Sauerb.

Genus of moss

Braithwaitea is a genus of moss in the monogeneric family Braithwaiteaceae. The genus comprises a single species, Braithwaitea sulcata.

Braithwaitea is a large, frondose moss occurring in eastern and south-eastern Australia, Lord Howe Island, New Zealand and New Caledonia.
