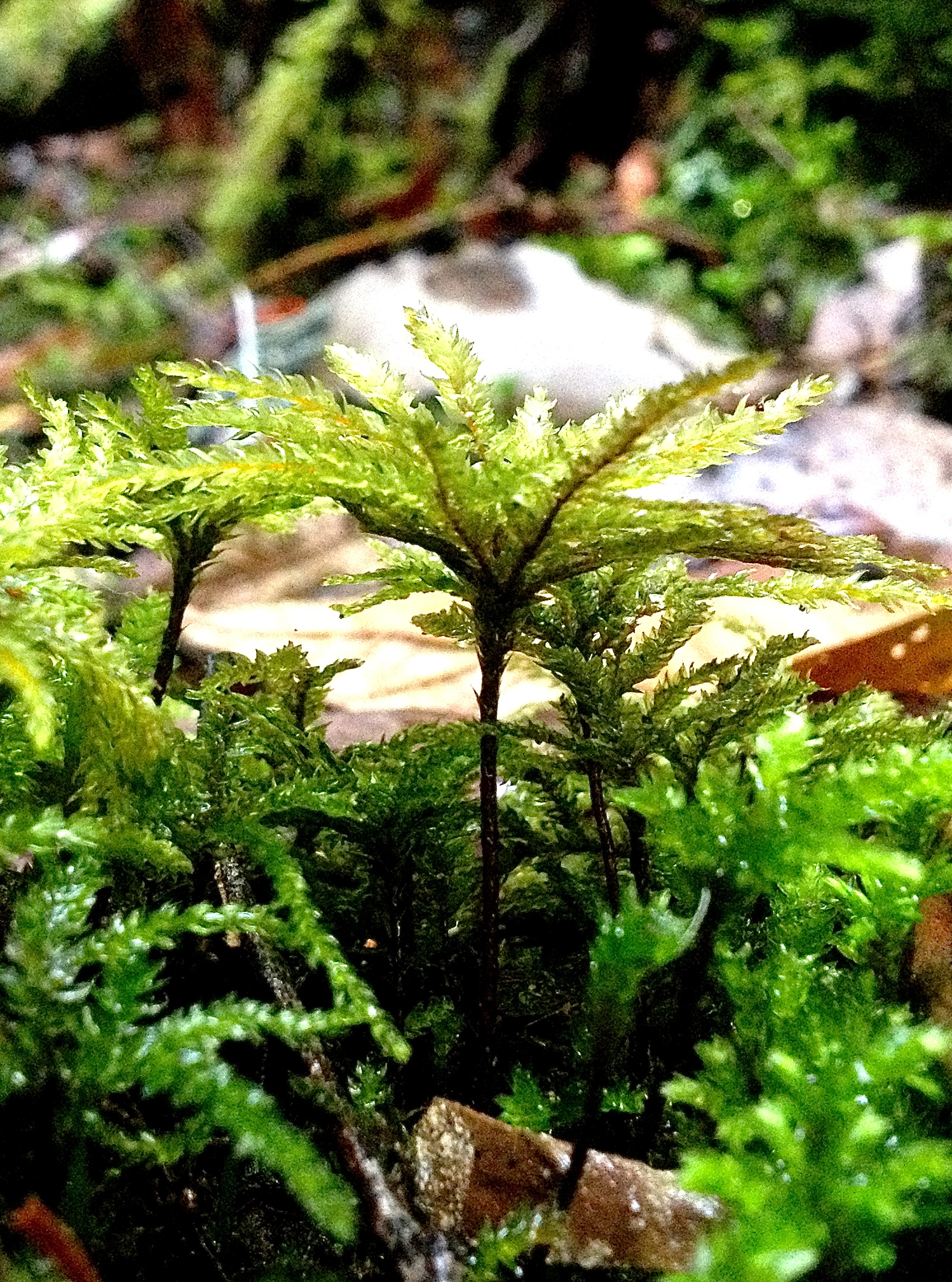
- Hypnodendron spininervium

Scientific classification
- Kingdom: Plantae
- Division: Bryophyta
- Class: Bryopsida
- Subclass: Bryidae
- Order: Hypnodendrales
- Family: Hypnodendraceae; Broth.

= Hypnodendraceae =

Family of mosses

Hypnodendraceae is a family of mosses belonging to the order Hypnodendrales.

Genera:

- Braithwaitea
- Dendrohypnum Hampe, 1872
- Hypnodendron (Müll. Hal.) Lindb. ex Mitt.
- Mniodendron Lindb. ex Dozy & Molk.
- Touwiodendron N.E.Bell, A.E.Newton & D.Quandt, 2007
