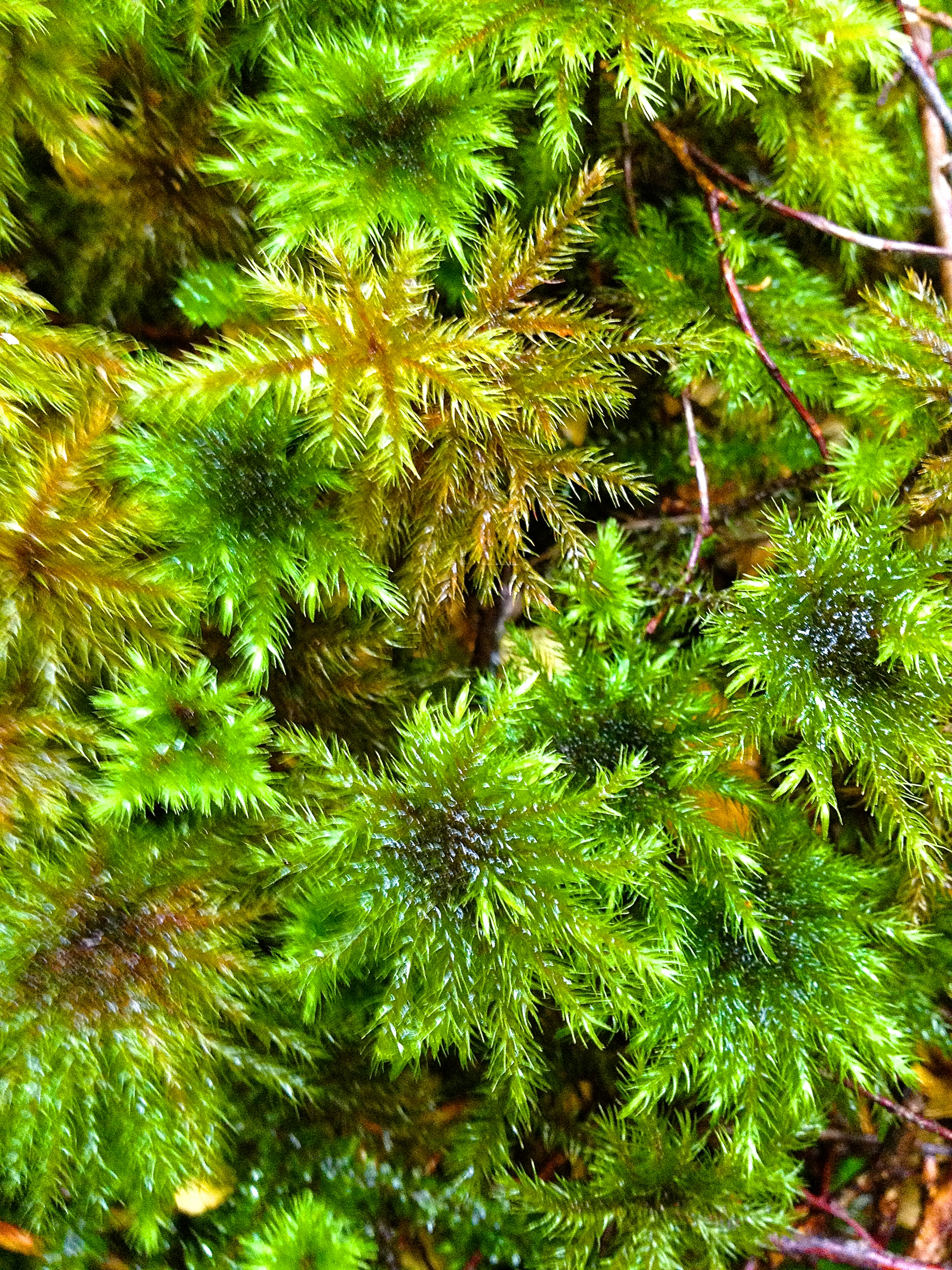
- Mniodendron comosum

Scientific classification
- Kingdom: Plantae
- Division: Bryophyta
- Class: Bryopsida
- Subclass: Bryidae
- Superorder: Hypnanae
- Order: Hypnodendrales; N.E.Bell, A.E.Newton & D.Quandt

Families
- See Classification

= Hypnodendrales =

Order of mosses

Hypnodendrales is an order of mosses.

== Description ==
Species in the order are robust pleurocarpous mosses. They are generally characterized by basally reiterating stems or stipes with secondary branching towards the apex. The order is mostly restricted to the Southern Hemisphere.

== Classification ==
There are four families placed in the Hypnodendrales:

- Braithwaiteaceae
- Hypnodendraceae
- Pterobryellaceae
- Racopilaceae
