= List of Liberty ships (F) =

This is a list of Liberty ships with names beginning with F.

== Description ==
The standard Liberty ship (EC-2-S-C1 type) was a cargo ship 441 feet 6 inches (134.57 m) long overall, with a beam of 56 feet 10 3/4 inches (17.34 m). It had a depth of 37 feet 4 inches (11.38 m) and a draft of 26 feet 10 inches (8.18 m). It was powered by a triple expansion steam engine, which had cylinders of 24 1/2 inches (62 cm), 37 inches (94 cm) and 70 inches (180 cm) diameter by 48 inches (120 cm) stroke. The engine produced 2,500ihp at 76rpm. Driving a four-blade propeller 18 feet 6 inches (5.64 m) in diameter, could propel the ship at 11 knots (20 km/h).

Cargo was carried in five holds, numbered 1–5 from bow to stern. Grain capacity was 84,183 cubic feet (2,383.8 m^{3}), 145,604 cubic feet (4,123.0 m^{3}), 96,429 cubic feet (2,730.6 m^{3}), 93,190 cubic feet (2,639 m^{3}) and 93,190 cubic feet (2,639 m^{3}), with a further 49,086 cubic feet (1,390.0 m^{3}) in the deep tanks. Bale capacity was 75,405 cubic feet (2,135.2 m^{3}), 134,638 cubic feet (3,812.5 m^{3}), 83,697 cubic feet (2,370.0 m^{3}), 82,263 cubic feet (2,329.4 m^{3}) and 82,435 cubic feet (2,334.3 m^{3}), with a further 41,135 cubic feet (1,164.8 m^{3}) in the deep tanks.

It carried a crew of 45, plus 36 United States Navy Armed Guard gunners. Later in the war, this was altered to a crew of 52, plus 29 gunners. Accommodation was in a three deck superstructure placed midships. The galley was equipped with a range, a 25 US gallons (95 L) stock kettle and other appliances. Messrooms were equipped with an electric hot plate and an electric toaster.

== F. A. C. Muhlenberg ==
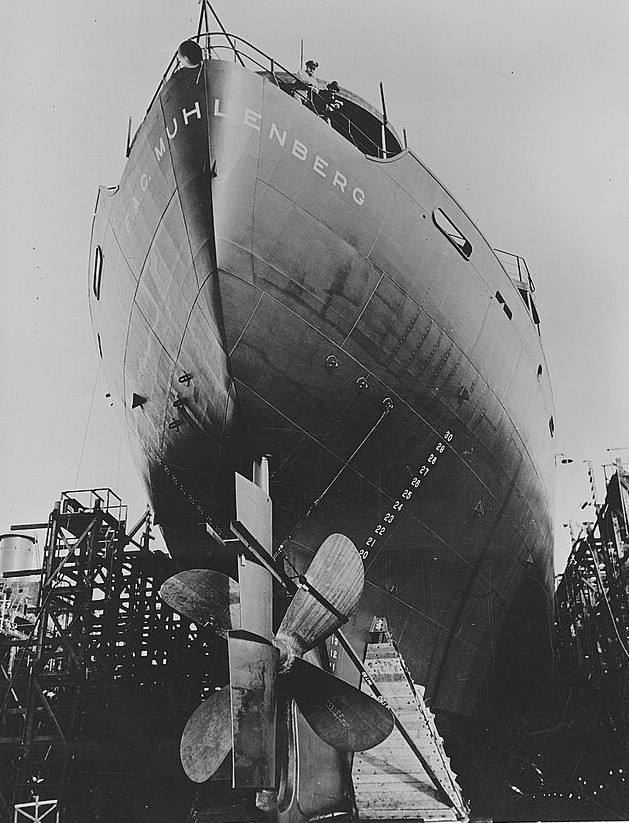
F. A. C. Muhlenberg

F. A. C. Muhlenberg was built by California Shipbuilding Corporation, Terminal Island, Los Angeles, California. Her keel was laid on 24 February 1942. She was launched on 13 May and delivered on 13 June. A troop carrier, she was built for the War Shipping Administration (WSA) and operated under the management of Luckenbach Steamship Co., Inc. Bombed and set afire at Naples, Italy on 25 January 1944 whilst on a voyage from Norfolk, Virginia to Naples. Her midships was burnt out. Temporary repairs made to enable her to sail to New York for permanent repairs. To the French Government in 1947 and renamed Robert d'Espagne. Operated under the management of Chargeurs Réunis, Paris. Management transferred to Compagnie des Transportes Oceaniques in 1948. Sold in 1954 to Chargeurs Réunis. Sold in 1961 to Aktis Compania Navigation, Panama and renamed Agapi. Re-registered to Lebanon and operated under the management of Tharros Shipping Co. Management transferred to Pegasus Ocean Services Ltd. Ran aground and caught fire in the Pusur River (21°36′N 89°31′E) on 1 July 1966 whilst on a voyage from Chinwangtao, China to Chalna, East Pakistan. Declared a constructive total loss, she was scrapped at Osaka, Japan in October 1966.

== Felipe de Neve ==
Felipe de Neve was built by California Shipbuilding Corporation. Her keel was laid on 26 July 1942. She was launched on 4 September and delivered on 19 September. She was scrapped at Kearny, New Jersey in 1966.

== Felipi De Bastrop ==
Felipi De Bastrop was built by Todd Houston Shipbuilding Corporation, Houston, Texas. Her keel was laid on 11 March 1944. She was launched on 19 April and delivered on 29 April. She was scrapped at Tampa, Florida in February 1961.

== Felix Grundy ==
Felix Grundy was built by Southeastern Shipbuilding Corporation, Savannah, Georgia. Her keel was laid on 22 February 1943. She was launched on 12 May and delivered on 12 June. She was scrapped at New Orleans, Louisiana in May 1965.

== Felix Hathaway ==
Felix Hathaway was built by Oregon Shipbuilding Corporation, Portland, Oregon. Her keel was laid on 7 June 1942. She was launched on 26 June and delivered on 4 July. She was scrapped at Oakland, California in 1959.

== Felix Riesenberg ==
Felix Risenberg was built by J. A. Jones Construction Company, Brunswick. Her keel was laid on 16 November 1944. She was launched on 14 December and delivered on 26 December. Built for the WSA, she was operated under the management of American-West African Line. Management transferred to States Steamship Company in 1946, then to Pacific-Atlantic Steamship Company in 1947. Sold in 1951 to Pacific Waterways Corp. and renamed Transatlantic. Operated under the management of Palmer Shipping Corp. Management transferred to Boise Griffin Agencies Corp. in 1952, then Tak Shipping Corp. in 1954. Sold in 1959 to Alaska Steamship Company, Seattle, Washington and renamed Nenana. Converted to carry containers as well as normal cargo. Laid up at Seattle in 1970. Sold to Seattle shipbreakers in October 1970. Resold, she was scrapped at Kaohsiung, Taiwan in September 1972.

== Ferdinand A. Silcox ==
Ferdinand A. Silcox was built by Permanente Metals Corporation, Richmond, California. Her keel was laid on 10 October 1943. She was launched on 28 October and delivered on 6 November. She was scrapped at Panama City, Florida in October 1970.

== Ferdinand Gagnon ==
Ferdinand Gagnon was built by New England Shipbuilding Corporation, South Portland, Maine. Her keel was laid on 24 July 1944. She was launched on 8 September and delivered on 19 September. She was scrapped at New Orleans in 1963.

== Ferdinando Gorges ==
Ferdinando Gorges was built by New England Shipbuilding Corporation. Her keel was laid on 24 June 1943. She was launched on 12 August and delivered on 27 August. She was scrapped at Panama City, Florida in January 1965.

== Ferdinand R. Hassler ==
Ferdinand R. Hassler was built by Delta Shipbuilding Company New Orleans. Her keel was laid on 3 May 1944. She was launched on 22 June and delivered on 1 August. Laid up at Mobile, Alabama post-war She was scrapped at Panama City, Florida in January 1973.

== Ferdinand Westdahl ==
Ferdinand Westdahl was built by Permanente Metals Corporation. Her keel was laid on 25 October 1943. She was launched on 12 November and delivered on 20 November. She was scrapped at Portland, Oregon in June 1967.

== Filipp Mazzei ==
Filipp Mazzei was built by St. Johns River Shipbuilding Company, Jacksonville, Florida. Her keel was laid on 15 June 1944. She was launched on 31 July and delivered on 15 August. She was scrapped at Baltimore, Maryland in March 1960.

== Finley Peter Dunne ==
Finley Peter Dunne was built by California Shipbuilding Corporation. Her keel was laid on 30 May 1943. She was launched on 21 June and delivered on 30 June. Built for the WSA, she was operated under the management of Seas Shipping Co. Laid up in 1946, she was sold in 1947 to Rethymnis & Kulukundis (Hellas), Athens, Greece & London, United Kingdom. Registered in Greece. Sold later that year to M. E. Kulukundis. Sold in 1950 to G. Coumantaros and renamed Evrotas. Operated under the management of Southern Steamship Co. Sold in 1952 to Commercial & Maritime Enterprises Epidavros, Athens. Renamed Epidavros in 1953. Placed under the management of United Operators Shipping Agencies in 1956. Sold in 1965 to Gemini Navigation Corp. and renamed Ionic Bay. Operated under the management of Ionic Shipping Agency. Management transferred to Sea Ship Navigation Inc. in 1966. She was scrapped at Tsuneishi, Japan in April 1967.

== Fisher Ames ==
Fisher Ames was built by Oregon Shipbuilding Corporation. Her keel was laid on 12 January 1942. She was launched on 17 March and delivered on 24 April. Laid up in the Hudson River post-war, she was scrapped at Kearny in June 1970.

== Fitzhugh Lee (I) ==
Fitzhugh Lee was built by Todd Houston Shipbuilding Corporation. Her keel was laid on 12 October 1942. Launched as Fitzhugh Lee on 12 December, she was delivered as Big Foot Wallace on 30 December. Laid up in 1945, but returned to service in 1946 before being laid up again. Served during the Korean War, then laid up at Mobile. She was scrapped at Panama City, Florida in August 1965.

== Fitzhugh Lee (II)) ==
Fitzhugh Lee was built by Todd Houston Shipbuilding Corporation. Her keel was laid on 29 January 1943. She was launched on 16 March and delivered on 31 March. She was scrapped at Baltimore in September 1959.

== FitzJohn Porter ==
FitzJohn Porter was built by California Shipbuilding Corporation. Her keel was laid on 22 August 1942. She was launched on 27 September and delivered on 15 October. Built for the WSA, she was operated under the management of McCormick Steamship Co. Torpedoed and sunk in the Atlantic Ocean (12°20′S 37°01′W) on 1 March 1943 by U-518 whilst on a voyage from Bombay, India to Paramaribo, Suriname.

== Flora MacDonald ==
Flora MacDonald was built by North Carolina Shipbuilding Company. Her keel was laid on 30 December 1942. She was launched on 30 January 1943 and delivered on 9 February. Built for the WSA, she was operated under the management of Calmar Steamship Company. Torpedoed and set afire in the Atlantic Ocean off the coast of Sierra Leone on 30 May 1943 by U-126 whilst on a voyage from Takoradi, Gold Coast to Freetown, Sierra Leone. She was beached at Freetown, but was declared a total loss.

== Florence Crittenton ==
Florence Crittenton was built by California Shipbuilding Corporation. Her keel was laid on 24 May 1943. She was launched on 15 June and delivered on 26 June. She was scrapped at Panama City, Florida in January 1967.

== Florence Martus ==
Florence Martus was built by Southeastern Shipbuilding Corporation. Her keel was laid on 27 September 1943. She was launched on 11 November and delivered on 23 November. She was scrapped at Baltimore in May 1960.

== Floyd Bennett ==
Floyd Bennett was built by Permanente Metals Corporation. Her keel was laid on 28 July 1943. She was launched on 22 August and delivered on 31 August. Laid up in the Hudson River post-war, she was scrapped at Kearny in November 1970.

== Floyd B. Olson ==
Floyd B. Olson was built by Permanente Metals Corporation. Her keel was laid on 3 June 1943. She was launched on 28 June and delivered on 13 July. She was scrapped at Hirao, Japan in December 1961.

== Floyd Gibbons ==
Floyd Gibbons was built by Southeastern Shipbuilding Corporation. Her keel was laid on 17 July 1944. She was launched on 31 August and delivered on 15 September. She was scrapped at Kearny in April 1966.

== Floyd W. Spencer ==
Floyd W. Spencer was built by Delta Shipbuilding Company. Her keel was laid on 17 May 1944. She was launched on 1 July and delivered on 22 August. To United States Navy in 1953. Converted to an experimental minesweeper at Yokosuka, Japan. Allocated te pennant number YAG-36, but not named. Sold for scrapping in Japan in 1960.

== F. Marion Crawford ==
F. Marion Crawford was built by Permanente Metals Corporation. Her keel was laid on 14 June 1942. She was launched on 14 August and delivered on 19 September. Built for the WSA, she was operated under the management of McCormick Steamship Company. She was scrapped at New Orleans in June 1970.

== Fort Orange ==
Fort Orange was built by New England Shipbuilding Corporation. Her keel was laid on 24 July 1943. She was launched as Tobias Lear on 11 September and delivered as Fort Orange on 22 September. To the Dutch Government under Lend-Lease. Operated under the management of Nederlandsch-Amerikaansche Stoomvaart Maatschappij, Rotterdam. Reported to have been renamed Erasmus in 1946, the name reverting that year. Sold to her managers in 1947 and renamed Blijdendijk. Sold in 1957 to Ditta Luigi Pittaluga Vapori, Genoa, Italy and renamed Transilvania. Sold in 1965 to Mount Athos Shipping Co. and renamed Mount Athos. Re-registered to Liberia and operated under the management of Dynamic Shipping Corp. Ran aground in the Rio Grande do Sul (30°31′S 50°20′W) on 11 March 1967 whilst on a voyage from Tampa to Porto Alegre, Brazil. She was abandoned as a compromised total loss.

== Frances E. Willard ==
Frances E. Willard was built by Permanente Metals Corporation. Her keel was laid on 17 February 1943. She was launched on 16 March and delivered on 29 March. She was scrapped at Hirao in September 1961.

== Francis Amasa Walker ==
Francis Amasa Walker was built by New England Shipbuilding Corporation. Her keel was laid on 4 January 1943. She was launched on 7 March and delivered on 4 April. She was scrapped at Panama City, Florida in 1966.

== Francis A. Retka ==
Francis A. Retka was built by New England Shipbuilding Corporation. Her keel was laid on 4 December 1944. She was launched on 27 January and delivered on 12 February. Built for the WSA, she was operated under the management of Boland & Cornelius. Laid up at Wilmington, North Carolina in 1948, she was sold in 1951 to Tramp Cargo Carriers, New york and renamed Liberty Bell. Sold in 1956 to Polarus Steamship Corp., New York and renamed I. R. Lashins. Sold in 1957 to Southport Steamship Corp., New York and renamed Southport. Sold in 1958 to Blidberg Rothchild Company, New York. Sold in 1964 to Alaska Steamship Company and renamed Oduna. Converted to carry containers as well as normal cargo. Ran aground at Cape Pankof, Unimak Island, Alaska on 26 November 1965 whilst on a voyage from Adak, Alaska to Seattle. Abandoned as a total loss.

== Francis Asbury ==
Francis Asbury was built by St. Johns River Shipbuilding Company. Her keel was laid on 12 September 1942. She was launched on 17 April 1943 and delivered on 5 June. Built for the WSA, she was operated under the management of A. H. Bull & Co. Struck a mine in the North Sea off Ostend, Belgium (51°21′N 3°00′E) whilst on a voyage from New York to Antwerp, Belgium. She was beached off Blankenberge but broke in two and was declared a total loss. The wreck was partially scrapped in October 1954 and dispersed in 1963.

== Francis A. Wardwell ==
Francis A. Wardwell was built by Permanente Metals Corporation. Her keel was laid on 5 October 1943. She was launched on 24 October and delivered on 31 October. Laid up in the Hudson River post-war, she was scrapped at Castellón de la Plana, Spain in January 1971.

== Francis B. Ogden ==
Francis B. Ogden was built by Todd Houston Shipbuilding Corporation. Her keel was laid on 20 September 1944. She was launched on 24 October and delivered on 4 November. She was scrapped at Kearny in August 1965.

== Francis C. Harrington ==
Francis C. Harrington was built by Bethlehem Fairfield Shipyard. Her keel was laid on 18 October 1943. She was launched on 18 November and delivered on 23 November. Built for the WSA, she was operated under the management of International Freighting Corp. She struck a mine off Juno Beach, Normandy, France on 7 June 1944 and was damaged. Repairs were made at Middlesbrough, United Kingdom. Laid up post-war, she was scrapped at Kearny in 1962.

== Francisco Coronado ==
Francisco Coronado was built by Kaiser Shipbuilding Company, Vancouver, Washington. She was delivered in January 1943. Used as a grain storage vessel in the 1950s. She was scrapped in Baltimore in March 1962.

== Francisco M. Quinones ==
Francisco M. Quinones was built by Permanente Metals Corporation. Her keel was laid on 22 October 1943. She was launched on 10 November and delivered on 18 November. She was scrapped at Green Cove Springs, Florida in September 1968.

== Francisco Morazan ==
Haralampos Hadjipateras

Francisco Morazan was built by Permanente Metals Corporation. Her keel was laid on 30 December 1943. She was launched on 18 January 1944 and delivered on 25 January. Built for the WSA, she was operated under the management of Isthmian Steamship Company. Sold in 1946 to Petros J. Coulandris, Piraeus, Greece and renamed Chryssi. Placed under the management of Capeside Steamship Co. Ltd. in 1948. Renamed Haralampos Hadjipateras in 1952. Later sold to A. C. Hadjipateras. Sold in 1960 to Sapphire Compania Navigation, Panama. Remained registered in Greece. Renamed Aegaion in 1963. She was scrapped at Shanghai in April 1967.

== Francis D. Culkin ==
Francis D. Culkin was built by Bethlehem Fairfield Shipyard. Her keel was laid on 16 March 1944. She was launched on 17 April and delivered on 28 April. Built for the WSA, she was operated under the management of Wessel, Duval & Co., New York. Sold to her managers in 1947 and renamed Thomas F. Baker. Sold in 1950 to Gulf Range Steamship Corp., New York. Sold in 1954 to Trident Transport Corp., New York and renamed Meta D. Ran aground on the Fuller Bank, in the English Channel 4 nautical miles (7.4 km) south of Selsey Bill, United Kingdom on 22 February 1955 whilst on a voyage from the Hampton Roads, Virginia to Rotterdam. Refloated on 25 February and towed in to Southampton. Declared a constructive total loss, she was sold to Palizada Compania Navigation, Panama and renamed Periolos. Re-registered to Liberia and operated under the management of G. Nicolaou. Management transferred to Tropis Shipping Co. in 1959. Re-registered to Greece in 1960. Management transferred to Pegasus Ocean Services in 1964. Driven ashore 3 nautical miles (5.6 km) north of Colombo, Ceylon on 20 October 1967. Salvage was deemed uneconomic and she was abandoned as a total loss.

== Francis Drake ==
Francis Drake was built by California Shipbuilding Corporation. Her keel was laid on 27 June 1942. She was launched on 8 August and delivered on 27 August. Laid up at Mobile post-war, she was scrapped at Panama City, Florida in October 1971.

== Francis E. Siltz ==
Francis E. Siltz was built by Todd Houston Shipbuilding Corporation. Her keel was laid on 20 January 1945. She was launched on 24 February and delivered on 9 March. Built for the WSA, she was operated under the management of Wessel, Duval & Co. Management transferred to West Coast Trans-Oceanic Steamship Line, Portland, Oregon in 1946. Sold to her managers later that year and renamed Portland Trader. Sold in 1955 to West Coast Steamship Co., Portland, Oregon. Ran aground on the Tubbahata Reef, 400 nautical miles (740 km) south of Manila, Philippines on 5 January 1961 whilst on a voyage from Vancouver, Washington to Calcutta, India. Declared a constructive total loss, she was sold for breaking. Scrapped at Hong Kong in April 1961.

== Francis E. Warren ==
Francis E. Warren was built by Oregon Shipbuilding Corporation. Her keel was laid on 4 May 1943. She was launched on 23 May and delivered on 31 May. Laid up at Mobile post-war, she was scrapped at Mobile in January 1971.

== Francis G. Newlands ==
Francis G. Newlands was built by Permanente Metals Corporation. Her keel was laid on 7 June 1943. She was launched on 6 July and delivered on 20 July. She was scrapped at New Orleans in August 1965.

== Francis J. O'Gara ==
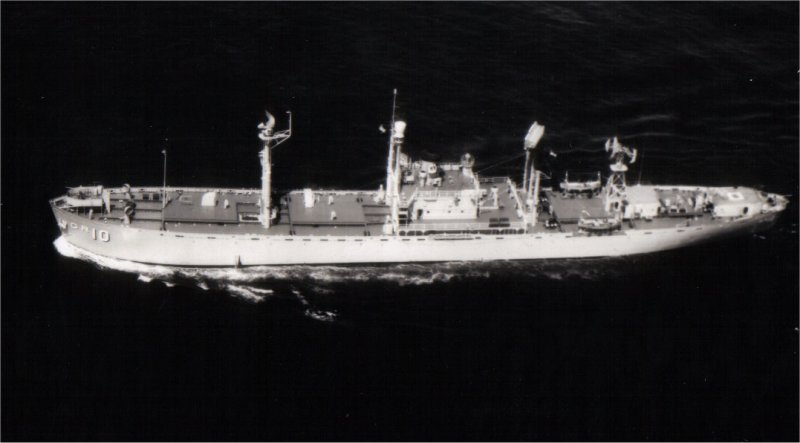
USS Outpost

Francis J. O'Gara was a boxed aircraft transport ship built by J. A. Jones Construction Company, Panama City. Her keel was laid on 14 April 1945. She was launched 8 June and delivered on 30 June. Built for the WSA, she was laid up in the Hudson River in June 1946. Returned to service in January 1947, only to be laid up at Mobile in January 1948. To the United States Navy in May 1956 and renamed Outpost. Converted for naval use at Philadelphia Naval Shipyard. Laid up in reserve in the Hudson River in July 1965. Sold to shipbreakers in Bilbao, Spain in November 1970.

== Francis Lewis ==
Francis Lewis was built by Permanente Metals Corporation. Her keel was laid on 22 May 1942. She was launched on 24 July and delivered on 13 August. She was scrapped at Kearny in April 1970.

== Francis L. Lee ==
Francis L. Lee was built by Bethlehem Fairfield Shipyard. Her keel was laid on 13 October 1941. She was launched on 14 March 1942 and delivered on 27 April. she was scrapped at Savannah in February 1965.

== Francis Marion ==
Francis Marion was built by North Carolina Shipbuilding Company. Her keel was laid on 4 September 1941. She was launched on 22 March 1942 and delivered on 27 April. She was scrapped at Oakland in December 1967.

== Francis M. Smith ==
Francis M. Smith was built by Permanente Metals Corporation. Her keel was laid on 11 September 1943. She was launched on 30 September and delivered on 9 October. She was scrapped at Baltimore in February 1962.

== Francis Nash ==
Francis Nash was built by North Carolina Shipbuilding Company. Her keel was laid on 22 December 1942. She was launched on 21 January 1943 and delivered on 31 January. Built for the WSA, she was operated under the management of Barber Steamship Lines and American-West African Line. To the Norwegian Government in 1943 under charter and renamed Fridtjof Nansen. Collided with the American Liberty ship Stephen C. Foster on 16 March 1943 whilst on a voyage from Baltimore to a port in Algeria. Sold in 1946 to A/S Odderø, Kristiansand. Operated under the management of A. I. Langfeldt & Co. Sold in November 1959 to Olisman Compania Navigation, Beirut, Lebanon and renamed Olga. Placed under the management of Franco Shipping Corp. in 1961. Sold in 1966 to Olisman Compania Navigation S.A., Piraeus, then sold in 1967 to Ourania Shipping Co. Ltd., Famagusta, Cyprus. Sold to Spanish shipbreakers in May 1971, she arrived at Gandia on 21 May, and was scrapped in July.

== Francis N. Blanchet ==
Francis N. Blanchet was built by Oregon Shipbuilding Corporation. Her keel was laid on 22 September 1943. She was launched on 9 October and delivered on 17 October. She was scrapped at Portland, Oregon in November 1961.

== Francis Parkman ==
Francis Parkman was built by California Shipbuilding Corporation. Her keel was laid on 13 May 1942. She was launched on 29 June and delivered on 21 July. She was scrapped at Osaka in April 1961.

== Francis P. Duffy ==
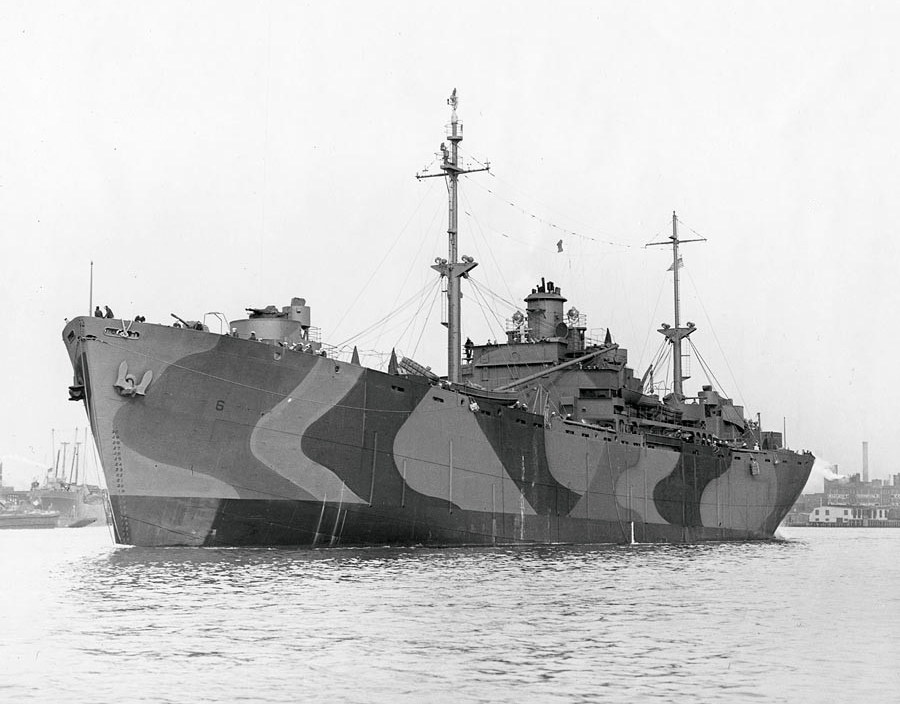
USS Cebu

Francis P. Duffy was built by Bethlehem Fairfield Shipyard. Her keel was laid on 21 September 1943. She was launched as Francis P. Duffy on 18 October and delivered to the United States Navy as Cebu on 27 October. Laid up in Suisun Bay in June 1947, she was scrapped at Portland, Oregon in October 1973.

== Francis Preston Blair ==
Francis Preston Blair was built by Marinship Corporation, Sausalito, California. Her keel was laid on 17 October 1942. She was launched on 3 January 1943 and delivered on 10 February. Built for the WSA, she was operated under the management of Sudden & Christensen. Ran aground on the Saumarez Reef off the coast of Queensland, Australia on 15 July 1945 whilst on a voyage from Manila to Sydney, Australia. She may have been avoiding a Japanese submarine at the time. Sold to the Australian Government in 1952. Used by the Royal Australian Air Force as a target ship. Still aground on the reef in 1985.

== Francis S. Bartow ==
Francis S. Bartow was built by Southeastern Shipbuilding Corporation. Her keel was laid on 11 April 1944. She was launched as Francis S. Bartow on 22 May and delivered as Themistocles on 9 June. To the Greek Government under Lend-Lease. Sold in 1946 to Ionian Steamship Co., Athens. Placed under the management of Vergottis Ltd. in 1958. Sold in 1969 to Fundador Compania Navigation, Panama. Remaining registered in Greece, and under the same management. She was scrapped at Whampoa Dock, Hong Kong in May 1971.

== Francis Scott Key ==
Francis Scott Key was built by Bethlehem Fairfield Shipyard. Her keel was laid on 21 June 1941. She was launched on 15 November and delivered on 29 January 1942. She was scrapped at Portland, Oregon in September 1967.

== Francis Vigo ==
Francis Vigo was built by Bethlehem Fairfield Shipyard. Her keel was laid on 26 August 1943. She was launched on 19 September and delivered on 27 September. She was scrapped at Baltimore in 1962.

== Francis W. Parker ==
Francis W. Parker was built by Oregon Shipbuilding Corporation. Her keel was laid on 13 October 1943. She was launched on 1 November and delivered on 10 November. She was scrapped at Philadelphia in 1965.

== Francis W. Pettygrove ==
Francis W. Pettygrove was built by Oregon Shipbuilding Corporation. Her keel was laid on 17 March 1943. She was launched on 4 April and delivered on 13 April. built for the WSA, she was operated under the management of American Mail Line. Torpedoed and damaged by Axis aircraft in the Mediterranean Sea (36°08′N 2°14′W) on 13 August 1943 whilst on a voyage from Port Said, Egypt to Gibraltar. She was towed in to Gibraltar on 15 August and beached. Declared a constructive total loss, she was sold for scrapping. Refloated on 21 June 1949, towed to Algecíras, Spain and subsequently scrapped.

== Francis Wilson ==
Francis Wilson was built by Permanente Metals Corporation. Her keel was laid on 24 November 1943. She was launched on 14 December and delivered on 21 December. She was scrapped at Baltimore in March 1962.

== Frank Adair Monroe ==
Frank Adair Monroe was built by Delta Shipbuilding Company. Her keel was laid on 22 March 1944. She was launched on 2 May and delivered on 22 June. Built for the WSA, she was operated under the management of American South African Line. Management transferred to Prudential Steamship Corp. in 1946. Sold in 1951 to Mercador Trading Inc., New York and renamed Skystar. Sold in 1952 to Marine Shipping Line, New York and renamed Christos M. Sold in 1954 to Lion Shipping Line, Panama and renamed Christos. Re-registered to Liberia and operated under the management of Triton Shipping Inc. Ran agroundon the Serrana Bank, in the Caribbean Sea on 4 June 1960 whilst on a voyage from Tampa to Yokohama, Japan. Refloated on 12 June, declared a constructive total loss but was repurchased by her owners. Renamed Agios Nicolas in 1961. Re-registered to Greece and operated under the management of Lyras Bros. Sold in 1965 to Micada Compania Navigation, Panama. Remained under the same registration and managers. She was scrapped at Kaohsiung in January 1968.

== Frank A. Munsey ==
Frank A. Munsey was built by Permanente Metals Corporation. Her keel was laid on 13 September 1943. She was launched on 2 October and delivered on 11 October. Laid up at Beaumont post-war, She was scrapped at Brownsville in August 1972.

== Frank A. Vanderlip ==
Frank A Vanderlip was built by Bethlehem Fairfield Shipyard. Her keel was laid on 15 October 1943. She was launched as Frank A. Vanderlip on 13 November and delivered as Sambuff on 20 November. To the Ministry of War Transport (MoWT), operated under the management of Union-Castle Steamship Co. Renamed Frank A. Vanderlip in 1944. To the United States Maritime Commission (USMC) in 1948. Laid up at Wilmington, North Carolina. She was scrapped at Kearny in May 1967.

== Frank B. Kellogg ==
Frank B. Kellogg was built by Oregon Shipbuilding Corporation. Her keel was laid on 1 November 1942. She was launched on 28 November and delivered on 7 December. She was scrapped at Oakland in 1962.

== Frank B. Linderman ==
Frank B. Linderman was built by Oregon Shipbuilding Corporation. Her keel was laid on 1 November 1943. She was launched on 20 November and delivered on 3 December. She was scrapped at Bellingham, Washington in February 1962.

== Frank C. Emerson ==
Frank C. Emerson was built by Permanente Metals Corporation. Her keel was laid on 20 September 1943. She was launched on 9 October and delivered on 18 October. Laid up in Puget Sound post-war, she was scrapped at Tacoma in November 1970.

== Frank D. Phinney ==
Frank D. Phinney was built by Permanente Metals Corporation. Her keel was laid on 28 June 1943. She was launched as Frank D. Phinney on 21 July and delivered as Samovar on 28 July. To MoWT under Lend-Lease. Operated under the management of T. & J. Brocklebank. On 9 September, whilst on her maiden voyage, she discovered the British tanker Trocas, which had suffered an engine room fire and was disabled in the Pacific Ocean. Samovar towed her 1,284 nautical miles (2,378 km) to Auckland, New Zealand. The two ships arrived on 27 September. Sold in 1946 to British & Burmese Steam Navigation Co. and renamed Kansi. Operated under the management of P. Hendersonn & Co. Sold in 1949 to Charente Steamship Co., Liverpool and renamed Colonial. Operated under the management of T. & J. Harrison Ltd. Renamed Planter in 1961. Sold in 1962 to Jayanti Shipping Co., London & Bombay and renamed Gargi Jayanti. Re-registered to India. Sold in 1967 to Pent-Ocean Steamship Ltd. Sold in 1968 to Shipping Corporation of India and renamed Samudra Jyoti. She was scrapped at Bombay in February 1972.

== Frank E. Spencer ==
Frank E. Spencer was built by Delta Shipbuilding Company. Her keel was laid on 4 December 1944. She was launched on 11 January 1945 and delivered on 18 March. Built for the WSA, she was operated under the management of South Atlantic Steamship Line. She was laid up at Mobile in 1949. Sold in 1951 to Bloomfield Steamship Co., Houston and renamed Anne Butler. Sold in 1954 to Valdemoro Compania Navigation, Panama and renamed Artemidi. Re-registered to Liberia and operated under the management of Sea Traffic & Trading Corp. Sold in 1957 to Eastern Maritime Corp. and renamed Myriam III. Re-registered to the United States and operated under the management of International Navigation Co. Sold in 1961 to Ocean Transport Ltd. and renamed Hari. Re-registered to Liberia and operated under the management of Venizelos SA. Sold in 1965 to Asopos Shipping Co., Panama and renamed Georgia. Operated under the management of Trident Shipping Agency. She was scrapped at Hirao in September 1967.

== Frank Flowers ==
Frank Flowers was a boxed aircraft transport ship built by J. A. Jones Construction Co., Panama City. Her keel was laid on 9 May 1945. She was launched on 22 June and delivered on 16 July. Laid up at Beaumont post-war, she was scrapped at Brownsville in September 1974.

== Frank Gilbreth ==
Frank Gilbreth was built by Walsh-Kaiser Company, Providence, Rhode Island. Her keel was laid on 4 November 1943. She was launched on 3 February 1944 and delivered on 22 April. Built for the WSA, she was operated under the management of American Export Lines. To the Dutch Government in 1946 and renamed Nicolaas Witsen. Operated under the management of Koninklijke Nederlandse Stoomboot-Maatschappij. Sold in 1947 to Koninklijken Hollandscheen Lloyd, Amsterdam and renamed Amstelland. Sold in 1961 to Seafarers Investments Inc. and renamed Erna Stathatos. Re-registered to Greece and operated under the management of Stathatos Ltd. Sold in 1965 to Deko Trading Co., Panama and renamed Albadoro. Re-registered to Liberia and operated under the management of Olympic Maritime SA. Sold in 1967 to Aconcagua Compania Panamena de Navigation, Panama. Remained registered in Liberia, and operated under the management of Central American Steamship Agency. She was scrapped at Vado Ligure, Italy in June 1972.

== Frank H. Dodd ==
Frank H. Dodd was built by Permanente Metals Corporation. Her keel was laid on 29 October 1943. She was launched on 16 November and delivered on 25 November. Built for the WSA, she was operated under the management of Lykes Bros. Steamship Co. Sold in 1947 to Giovanni B. Bibolini, Genoa and renamed Valentina B. Renamed Valentina Bibolini in 1948. Collided with the British cargo ship Alva Star off Sussex, United Kingdom on 3 April 1955 and was beached in Southampton Water. Collided with the British cargo ship Victoria City off Ameland, Netherlands on 14 December 1955. Victoria City sank. Sold in 1961 to Prosperity Shipping SA., Panama and renamed Katerina Samona. Re-registered to Liberia and operated under the management of G. Lemos. Her cargo shifted in the Atlantic Ocean (37°13′N 30°17′W) in December 1964 and she almost foundered. Towed to the Azores by the Dutch tug Maas. Repaired there and resumed her voyage from Port Alberni, Canada to Plymouth, United Kingdom. Sprang a leak in the Atlantic Ocean off the coast of Spain (44°30′N 12°40′W) on 28 December 1964. Towed in to Ferrol by the West German tug Atlantic. Attempts to repair her engine were unsuccessful, and she was towed to Plymouth by the British tug Serviceman. Renamed Paloma in 1966, then renamed Agios Giorgis later that year and placed under the management of John Samonas & Sons. Sprang a leak in the Indian Ocean (8°50′N 83°42′E on 25 July 1967 whilst on a voyage from Calcutta to a Japanese port. She put in to Colombo. A survey found the to be in a very poor condition. Although repairs were started, she departed on 2 August for Kaohsiung, where she was scrapped in September 1967.

== Frank H. Evers ==
Frank H. Evers was built by Permanente Metals Corporation. Her keel was laid on 19 November 1943. She was launched on 8 December and delivered on 16 December. Built for the WSA, she was operated under the management of American President Lines. Sold in 1947 to Giacomo Costa fu Andrea, Genoa and renamed Enrico C. Sold in 1963 to A. Marherencia Compania Navigation, Panama and renamed Nicolas A.. Re-registered to Liberia and operated under the management of Angelos Ltd. She was scrapped at Kaohsiung in April 1967.

== Frank J. Cuhel ==
Frank J. Cuhel was built by Permanente Metals Corporation. Her keel was laid on 19 December 1943. She was launched on 14 January 1944 and delivered on 24 February. Built for the WSA, she was operated under the management of Black Diamond Steamship Company. Sold in 1947 to Michael C. Peraticos, Chios, Greece and renamed Fotini. Sold later that year to Michael J. Carras, Athens. Sold in 1955 to Helix Co. Ltd., Athens and renamed Avra. Operated under the management of Carras Ltd. Sold in 1957 to Tropis Co. Ltd., Piraeus, remaining under the same management. Management transferred to Interocean Tramping Ltd. in 1961. She sprang a leak in the Arabian Sea 140 nautical miles (260 km) north of Cochin, India on 18 July 1965 whilst on a voyage from Mormugao, India to a Japanese port. Abandoned by her crew, she sank the next day (at 11°57′N 75°13′E).

== Frank Joseph Irwin ==
Frank Joseph Irwin was built by California Shipbuilding Corporation. Her keel was laid on 21 October 1942. She was launched on 21 November and delivered on 10 December. She was scrapped at Bilbao in October 1970.

== Frank J. Sprague ==
Frank J. Sprague was built by Permanente Metals Corporation. Her keel was laid on 29 November 1943. She was launched on 18 December and delivered on 27 December. She was scrapped at Portland, Oregon in February 1968.

== Franklin H. King ==
Franklin H. King was built by California Shipbuilding Corporation. Her keel was laid on 9 November 1943. She was launched on 6 December and delivered on 24 December. She was scrapped at Kearny in July 1967.

== Franklin K. Lane ==
Franklin K. Lane was built by California Shipbuilding Corporation. Her keel was laid on 6 May 1943. She was launched on 28 May and delivered on 11 June. She was scrapped at Panama City, Florida in October 1965.

== Franklin MacVeagh ==
Frankin MacVeagh was built by Oregon Shipbuilding Corporation. Her keel was laid on eq December 1942. She was launched on 29 January 1943 and delivered on 6 February. Built for the WSA, she was operated under the management of Franklin Steamship Co. To the Dutch Government in 1947 and renamed Hugo de Vries. Renamed Leuvekerk later that year and placed under the management of Vereenigde Nederlandsche Scheepvaarts Maatschappij, Den HaagRe-registered Sold to her managers inn 1950. Sold in 1960 to Jupiter Shipping Corp. and renamed Mitsa. Re-registered to Greece and operated under the management of Mentor Shipping Co. Sold in 1963 to Marmira Compania Navigation and renamed Athanassios K.. Remaining registered in Greece, and operated under the management of Carapanayiotis & Co. She was scrapped at Shanghai in August 1967.

== Franklin P. Mall ==
Franklin P. Mall was built by Bethlehem Fairield Shipyard. Her keel was laid on 13 February 1943. She was launched on 26 March and delivered on 7 April. She was scrapped at Philadelphia in March 1965.

== Frank Norris ==
Frank Norris was built by Permanente Metals Corporation. Her keel was laid on 9 September 1943. She was launched on 29 September and delivered on 7 October. Laid up at Mobile post-war, she was scrapped there in December 1971.

== Frank O. Peterson ==
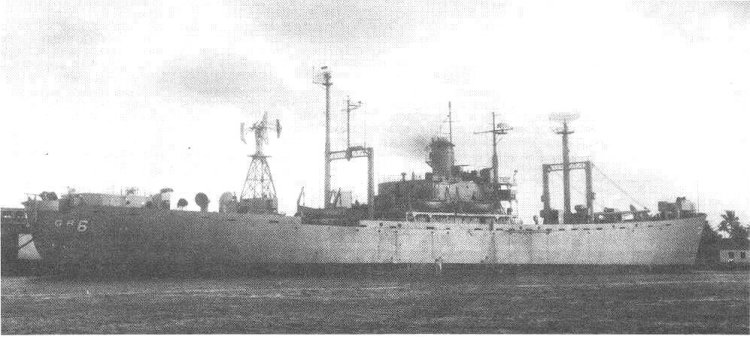
USS Locator

Frank O. Peterson was a boxed aircraft transport ship built by J. A. Jones Construction Co., Panama City. Her keel was laid on 9 February 1945. She was launched on 23 March and delivered on 6 April. To the United States Navy in June 1955 and renamed Locator. Converted for naval use at Charleston Naval Shipyard. Laid up in reserve in Suisun Bay in August 1965. Sold for scrapping in Portland Oregon in October 1974.

== Frank Park ==
Frank Park was built by J. A. Jones Construction Co., Brunswick. Her keel was laid on 10 June 1944. She was launched on 21 July and delivered on 31 July. Built for the WSA, she was operated under the management of United States Navigation Co. She was scrapped at Philadelphia in July 1962.

== Frank P. Reed ==
Frank P. Reed was built by New England Shipbuilding Corporation. Her keel was laid on 31 July 1944. She was launched on 18 September and delivered on 30 September. She was scrapped at Philadelphia in July 1970.

== Frank P. Walsh ==
Frank P. Walsh was built by Southeastern Shipbuilding Corporation. Her keel was laid on 12 July 1944. She was launched on 28 August and delivered on 8 September. Built for the WSA, she was operated under the management of R. A. Nicol & Co. Management transferred to Prudential Steamship Corp. in 1946. Laid up in 1950, she was sold in 1951 to Traders Steamship Corp., New York and renamed Bluestar. Sold in 1954 to Linares Compania Navigation, Panama and renamed Melody. Re-registered to Liberia and operated under the management of Triton Shipping Inc. She collided with the Dutch cargo ship Aldabi on 11 April 1956 whilst Aldabi was moored. The Dutch vessel was severely damaged. Melody was renamed Ikaros in 1960 and re-registered to Greece. Sold in 1966 to Synthia Shipping Co., Panama. Re-registered to Liberia and operated under the management of Nereus Shipping. She was scrapped at Hirao in October 1966.

== Frank R. Stockton ==
Frank R. Stockton was built by Bethlehem Fairfield Shipyard. Her keel was laid on 19 November 1943. She was launched on 12 December and delivered on 20 December. Built for the WSA, she was operated under the management of Calmar Steamship Company. Management transferred to South Atlantic Steamship Line, Savannah in 1946. Laid up at Wilmington, North Carolina in 1948, she was sold in 1951 to South Atlantic Steamship Line and renamed Southwave. Sold later that year to Amerocean Steamship Co. and renamed Amersea. Operated under the management of Blackchester Lines. Sold in 1954 to Amersea Navigation Corp. Re-registered to Liberia and operated under the management of North Atlantic Marine Co. Sold in 1956 to Hanover Steamship Corp. and renamed Ocean Skipper. Remained registered in Liberia, and operated under the management of Jason Steamship Co. Sold in 1962 to Universal Navigation Corp., Taipei, Taiwan and renamed Universal. Re-registered to China. Sold in 1964 to Chi Yuen Navigation Co., Taipei, remaining registered in Chima. Sold in 1965 to Union Maritime Corp., Taipei and re-registered to Taiwan. She was scrapped at Kaohsiung in October 1968.

== Frank Springer ==
Frank Springer was built by California Shipbuilding Corporation. Her keel was laid on 28 May 1943. She was launched on 19 June and delivered on 30 June. She was scrapped at Wilmington, North Carolina in October 1967.

== Frank Wiggins ==
Frank Wiggins was built by California Shipbuilding Corporation. Her keel was laid on 29 July 1943. She was launched on 21 August and delivered on 9 September. Built for the WSA, she was operated under the management of Isthmian Steamship Co. Sold in 1947 to Livanos Maritime Co., Greece and renamed Dirphys. Sold in 1950 to Vassilos J. Pateras, Piraeus. Sold in 1956 to B. Pateras, Greece and placed under the management of Lyras Bros. Sold in 1963 to Dirphys Shipping Co., Greece, remaining under the same management. She was scrapped at Shanghai in October 1967.

== Franz Boas ==
Franz Boas was built by Bethlehem Fairfield Shipyard. Her keel was laid on 3 September 1943. She was launched as Franz Boas on 26 September and delivered as Sammex on 5 October. To the MoWT under Lend-Lease, operated under the management of General Steam Navigation Company. Sold in 1947 to Sheaf Steam Shipping Co. and renamed Sheaf Mead. Operated under the management of W. A. Souter & Co. Sold in 1952 to Gerontas Compania Navigation, Panama and renamed Gerontas. Operated under the management of A. Lusi Ltd. Driven onto a sandbank off Cardross, United Kingdom on 21 December 1954. Management transferred to G. Lemos Bros. in 1956. Ran aground off Gdynia Poland on 24 August 1959 whilst of a voyage from Vitoria to Gdynia. Refloated on 27 August, declared a constructive total loss. She was scrapped at Hendrik-Ido-Ambacht, Netherlands in 1959.

== Franz Sigel ==
Franz Sigel was built by Permanente Metals Corporation. Her keel was laid on 27 January 1944. She was launched on 15 February and delivered on 24 February. Built for the WSA, she was operated under the management of Interocean Steamship Corp. Sold in 1947 to Waterman Steamship Corp., Mobile and renamed Governor O'Neal. Sold in 1948 to Seafarer Steamship Corp. and renamed Seafair. Operated under the management of Orion Shipping & Trading Co. Sold in 1957 to Intercontinental Liberties Inc. and placed under the management of Maritime Overseas Corp. Sold in 1962 to Crusader Tramp Ships Inc. and renamed Smith Crusader. Operated under the management of Earl J. Smith & Co. She was scrapped at Ferrol in September 1964.

== Fred C. Stebbins ==
Fred C. Stebbins was built by St. Johns River Shipbuilding Company. Her keel was laid on 24 November 1944. She was launched on 30 December and delivered on 11 January 1945. Reported to have been transferred to the United States Navy in 1961. Subsequently disposed of, presumed either scuttled or sunk as a target ship.

== Fred E. Joyce ==
Fred E. Joyce was built by New England Shipbuilding Corporation. Her keel was laid on 18 January 1945. She was launched on 12 March and delivered on 24 March. Built for the WSA, she was operated under the management of Stockard Steamship Corp. Laid up at Wilmington, North Carolina in 1947. Sold in 1951 to Wessel Duval Co., New York and renamed George L. Duval. Sold in 1954 to National Shipping & Trading Corp., New York and renamed National Freedom. Sold later that year to Lucenia Compania Navigation, Panama. Re-registered to Liberia and operated under the management of her previous owner. Sold in 1958 to Ocean Tramp Inc. and renamed Valiant Freedom. Re-registered to the United States and operated under the management of Ocean Carriers Corp. She ran aground off the Isla de Pinos, Cuba on 20 November 1959 whilst on a voyage from Trinidad to Mobile. She was refloated on 19 December. Sold in 1960 to Phoenix Steamship Corp. and renamed Mount Hood. Re-registered to Liberia and operated under the management of Cargo & Tankship Management Corp. She was scrapped at Hirao in May 1961.

== Frederic A. Eilers ==
Frederic A. Eilers was built by Permanente Metals Corporation. Her keel was laid on 15 September 1943. She was launched on 3 October and delivered on 12 October. Built for the WSA, she was operated under the management of United States Lines. Sold in 1947 to Compania di Navigazione San Siro, Genoa and renamed San Siro. Sold in 1955 to Società Italiana di Navigazione, Genoa and renamed Portoria. Sold in 1961 to Terrestre Marittima SpA., Genoa and renamed Elena Seconda. Sold in 1962 to Compania Italiana Transoceanica di Navigazione, Genoa. She was scrapped at La Spezia in March 1965.

== Frederic A. Kummer ==
Frederic A. Kummer was built by Bethlehem Fairfield Shipyard. Her keel was laid on 10 June 1944. She was launched on 18 July and delivered on 24 July. She was scrapped at Philadelphia in October 1967.

== Frederic C. Howe ==
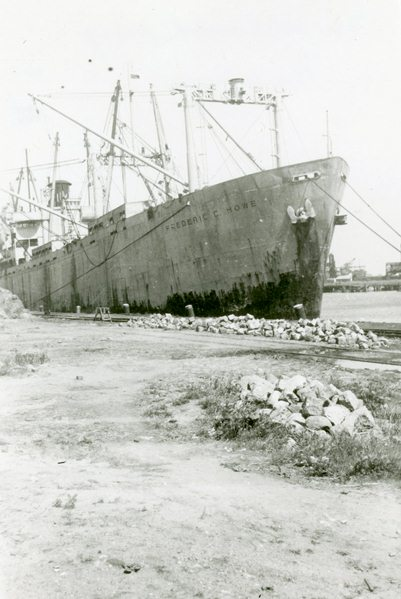
Frederic C. Howe

Frederic C. Howe was a tank transport built by J. A. Jones Construction Company, Panama City. Her keel was laid on 24 August 1943. She was launched on 30 October and delivered on 6 December. Laid up in the James River post-war she was scrapped at Kearny in October 1972.

== Frederic E. Hives ==
Frederic E. Hives was built by Todd Houston Shipbuilding Corporation. Her keel was laid on 17 August 1944. She was launched on 23 September and delivered on 4 October. Built for the WSA, she was operated under the management of Overlakes Freight Corp. Management transferred to States Marine Corp., New York in 1946. Sold to her managers in 1946 and renamed Global Carrier. Sold in February 1947 to Global Management Corp., Panama then sold on 8 July to Norge av Skibs A/S, Akershus, Norway and renamed Rana. Operated under the management of Gørrisen & Co. Sold later that month to Rederiet Gørrisen & Klaveness, Oslo. Sold on 8 September 1951 to Compania Naviera Acapulco S.A., Monrovia, Liberia and renamed Turmoil. Operated under the management of S. A. Embiricos. Sold in 1952 to Compania Maritima Andra, Monrovia. Sold on 17 April 1960 to Power Steamship Corp., New York and renamed Valentine Power. Operated under the management of Ocean Carriers Corp. Sold on 23 April to John B. P. Livanis, Piraeus and renamed Pantazis L. Sold on 27 November 1961 to Elnavigators Inc., Monrovia. Arrived at Hirao for scrapping on 22 June 1968. She was scrapped in August 1968.

== Frederick Austin ==
Frederick Austin was built by New England Shipbuilding Corporation. Her keel was laid on 14 March 1945. She was launched as Frederick Austin on 3 April and delivered as Dodekanisos on 23 May. Built for Constantine G. Gratsos, Athens. Renamed Audrey in 1947. Sold in 1959 to Amfialos Maritime Co., Panama. Remained registered in Greece. She was scrapped at Chittagong, India in October 1970.

== Frederick Banting ==
Frederick Banting was built by Bethlehem Fairfield Shipyard. Her keel was laid on 29 November 1943. She was launched on 20 December and delivered on 30 December. To the MoWT, operated under the management of City Line Ltd. Sold in 1947 to Ellerman's City Line and renamed City of St. Albans. Sold in 1959 to Society de Navigation Magliveras SA, Panama and renamed Marineri. Operated under the management of Luigi Monta fu Carlos. Sold in 1966 to Lymnia Shipping Co., Cyprus. Operated under the management of Wigham, Richardson & Co. Sold in 1967 to Four Winds Carriers Ltd, Cyprus. Operated under the management of Luigi Monta. Sold later that year to Dolphin Shipping Co., Cyprus and renamed Libertas, remaining under the same management. She was scrapped at Onomichi, Japan in March 1969.

== Frederick Bartholdi ==
Frederick Bartholdi was built by J. A. Jones Construction Company, Brunswick. Her keel was laid on 29 August 1943. She was launched on 9 November and delivered on 20 November. Built for the WSA, she was operated under the management of West India Steamship Co. Driven onto the Fladda Chuain Rocks, off the Isle of Skye, United Kingdom (57°44′N 6°26′W) on 25 December 1943 whilst on a voyage from Jacksonville to London. She broke her back and was declared a constructive total loss. She was scrapped in Kames Bay in September 1944.

== Frederick Billings ==
Frederick Billings was built by Oregon Shipbuilding Corporation. Her keel was laid on 1 September 1943. She was launched on 15 September and delivered on 22 September. She was scrapped at Oakland in May 1961.

== Frederick Bouchard ==
Frederick Bouchard was built by New England Shipbuilding Corporation. Her keel was laid on 30 September 1944. She was launched on 11 November and delivered on 24 November. She was scrapped at Tacoma in January 1964.

== Frederick C. Hicks ==
Frederick C. Hicks was built by California Shipbuilding Corporation. Her keel was laid on 9 February 1944. She was launched on 4 March and delivered on 23 March. Built for the WSA, she was operated under the management of Union Sulphur Company. Laid up in 1946, she was sold on 4 September 1947 to Rederi A/S Nidaros, Oslo and renamed Nidarland. Operated under the management of Krogstad Shipping Agencies. Sold on 1 March 1949 to Gørrisen & Co., A/S, Oslo. Sold in July 1949 to A/S Karabien, Oslo. Operated under the management of Gørrisen & Klaveness. Renamed Trya in January 1950. Sold in December 1952 to Elcarriers Inc., Monrovia and renamed Bendita. Operated under the management of Seres Shipping Inc. Sold in November 1958 to Palma Shipping Corp., Piraeus and renamed Despina K. Remaining under the same management. Management transferred to Ceres Shipping Co. in 1959, then to N. J. Vlassopulos Ltd. in 1961. Sold in 1963 to St. Ioannis Shipping Corp., Beirut. Remaining under the same management. Management transferred to Palmco Shipping Inc. in 1966. Ran aground 5 nautical miles (9.3 km) off Lázaro Cárdenas, Mexico (24°52′N 112°16′W) on 19 May 1967 whilst on a voyage from Tokyo to a port in Ecuador. She broke in two and was declared a total loss.

== Frederick Douglass ==
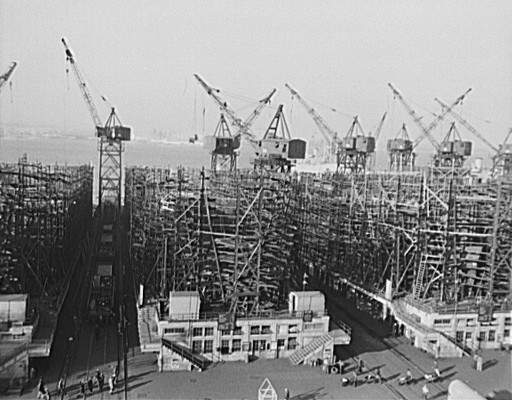
Frederick Douglass under construction.

Frederick Douglass was built by Bethlehem Fairfield Shipyard. Her keel was laid on 23 April 1943. She was launched on 22 May and delivered on 31 May. Built for the WSA, she was operated under the management of Luckenbach Steamship Co. Inc. Torpedoed and damaged in the Atlantic Ocean by U-238 on 20 September 1943 whilst on a voyage from Avonmouth, United Kingdom to New York. Subsequently torpedoed and sunk (57°03′N 28°08′W by U-645.

== Frederick E. Williamson ==
Frederick E. Williamson was a boxed aircraft transport ship built by J. A. Jones Construction Company, Panama City. Her keel was laid on 18 November 1944. She was launched on 23 December and delivered on 12 January 1945. Laid up in Puget Sound post-war, she was transferred to the United States Navy in May 1970. She was loaded with obsolete ammunition and scuttled 100 nautical miles (190 km) off Tatoosh Island, Washington.

== Frederick H. Baetjer ==
Frederick H. Baetjer was built by Bethlehem Fairfield Shipyard. Her keel was laid on 19 July 1944. She was launched on 21 August and delivered on 30 August. Built for the WSA, she was operated under the management of Dichmann, Wright & Pugh. Management transferred to Calmar Steamship Company. in 1946. Sold to her managers in 1947 and renamed Marymar. Sold in 1966 to Bethlehem Steel Corp. Operated under the management of her former owner. Returned to USMC in 1964 and laid up in the James River. She was scrapped at Santander, Spain in October 1970.

== Frederick H. Newell ==
Frederick H. Newell was built by Todd Houston Shipbuilding Corporation. Her keel was laid on 16 June 1943. She was launched on 26 July and delivered on 13 August. She was scrapped at Portland, Oregon in March 1968.

== Frederick Jackson Turner ==
Frederick Jackson Turner was built by Permanente Metals Corporation. Her keel was laid on 24 November 1942. She was launched on 28 December and delivered on 6 January 1943. She was scrapped at Baltimore in March 1962.

== Frederick L. Dau ==
Frederick L. Dau was built by Todd Houston Shipbuilding Corporation. Her keel was laid on 6 April 1943. She was launched on 17 May and delivered on 31 May. Built for the WSA, she was operated under the management of Calmar Steamship Company. Sold in 1947 to Vlassopoulos Bros., Ithaca, Greece and renamed Stylianos N. Vlassopoulos. Sold in 1964 to Plate Shipping Co., Panama and renamed Plate Trader. Operated under the management of P. B. Pandelis Ltd. Sold in 1966 to Amfithea Shipping Co., Cyprus and renamed Antonia II. Operated under the management of J. Livanos & Sons. Scrapped at Kaohsiung in April 1969.

== Frederic Remington ==
Frederic Remington was built by Permanente Metals Corporation. Her keel was laid on 1 November 1942. She was launched on 6 December and delivered on 15 December. Laid up at Mobile post-war, she was scrapped there in October 1970.

== Frederick Tresca ==
Frederick Tresca was built by St. Johns River Shipbuilding Company. Her keel was laid on 31 January 1944. She was launched as Frederick Tresca on 29 March and delivered to the United States Navy as Propus on 10 April. She was completed by Merrill-Stevens Drydock & Repair Co., Jacksonville. Returned to WSA in November 1945 and renamed Frederick Tresca. Laid up in the James River. Sold in 1947 to Nicolas G. Nicolaou, Athens and renamed Nicolaou Giorgios. Caught fire in the Red Sea (21°01′N 38°19′E) on 22 May 1951 whilst on a voyage from Darien to Trieste, Italy and was abandoned by her crew. Towed into Suez, Egypt by the American tanker Montebello Hills. Declared a constructive total loss. Sold to Achille Lauro, Naples and renamed Gabbiano. Second-hand diesel engine fitted at Trieste in 1952. Scrapped at La Spezia in January 1970.

== Frederick Von Steuben ==
Frederick Von Steuben was built by Delta Shipbuilding Company. Her keel was laid on 23 May 1944. She was launched on 12 July and delivered on 28 August. She was scrapped at Hamburg in March 1961.

== Frederick W. Taylor ==
Frederick W. Taylor was built by New England Shipbuilding Corporation. Her keel was laid on 26 December 1943. She was launched on 17 February 1944 and delivered on 29 February. She was scrapped at Panama City, Florida in January 1965.

== Frederick W. Wood ==
Frederick W. Wood was built by Bethlehem Fairfield Shipyard. Her keel was laid on 30 June 1944. She was launched on 7 August and delivered on 23 August. Built for the WSA, she was operated under the management of Cosmopolitan Shipping Co. Sold in 1947 to East Harbor Trading Co., New York and renamed Greenhaven Trails. Sold in 1951 to American Merchant Steamship Corp. and renamed Sea Cloud. Operated under the management of Seatraders Inc. Renamed Pacific Cloud in 1957. Sold in 1958 to Walter A. de Lappe Co., New York and renamed Waldo. Sold in 1960 to Peninsular Navigation Corp., New York and renamed San Marino. Returned to USMC in 1963 and scrapped at Tacoma.

== Frederic W. Galbraith ==
Frederic W. Galbraith was built by St. Johns River Shipbuilding Corporation. Her keel was laid on 30 September 1944. She was launched on 2 November and delivered on 14 November. Laid up at Mobile post-war, she was scrapped at Panama City, Florida in December 1970.

== Fred Herrling ==
Fred Herrling was built by St. Johns River Shipbuilding Company. Her keel was laid on 23 December 1944. She was launched on 30 January 1945 and delivered on 10 February. She was scrapped at Mobile in May 1969.

== Freeport Seam ==
Freeport Seam was a collier built by Delta Shipbuilding Company. Her keel was laid on 18 May 1945. She was launched on 30 July and delivered on 29 September. Built for the WSA, she was operated under the management of A. H. Bull & Co. Sold to her managers in 1946 and renamed Edith. She was scrapped at Hirao in January 1963.

== Fremont Older ==
Fremont Older was built by Permanente Metals Corporation. Her keel was laid on 26 May 1943. She was launched on 17 June and delivered on 28 June. Built for the WSA, she was operated under the management of American President Lines. Sold in 1947 to Zena Società di Navigazione per Azioni, Genoa and renamed Astro. Renamed Zeneize later that year. Sold in 1960 to Società per Azioni Industria Armamente, Genoa and renamed Cinan. Sold in 1964 to Meandros Shipping Co., Cyprus and renamed Artemida. Operated under the management of J. Livanos. Management transferred to Frangos Bros. & Co. in 1966. Sprang a severe leak on 5 October 1967 whilst on a voyage from Safaga, Egypt to a Chinese port and was beached off the Muar River, Malaysia (2°30′N 102°29′E). She was refloated on 18 October and towed to Singapore, then Shanghai. Driven ashore at Woosung on 30 November 1966. She broke in two and sank.

== F. Scott Fitzgerald ==
F. Scott Fitzgerald was built by New England Shipbuilding Corporation. Her keel was laid on 18 November 1944. She was launched on 15 January 1945 and delivered on 22 January. She was scrapped at Panama City, Florida in May 1962.

== F. Southall Farrar ==
F. Southall Farrar was built by J. A. Jones Construction Company, Brunswick, Georgia. Her keel was laid on 22 May 1944. She was launched on 4 July and delivered on 20 July. Built for the WSA, she was operated under the management of Union Sulphur Company. She was scrapped at Beaumont, Texas in 1966.

== F. T. Frelinghuysen ==
F. T. Frelinghuysen was built by Delta Shipbuilding Company. Her keel was laid on 30 March 1943. She was launched on 1 May and delivered on 22 May. She was scrapped at Baltimore in June 1960.

== Furnifold M. Simmons ==
Furnifold M. Simmons was built by North Carolina Shipbuilding Company. Her keel was laid on 13 January 1943. She was launched on 10 February and delivered on 18 February. Built for the WSA, she was operated under the management of R. A. Nicol & Co. Sold in 1947 to A/S D/S Svendborg, Denmark and renamed Ellen Mærsk. Operated under the management of A. P. Moller. Sold in 1948 to A/S J. Ludwig Mowinckels Rederi, Bergen, Norway and renamed Hada County. Sold in 1952 to Monarca Compania Navigation S.A., Panama and renamed Comet. Re-registered to Liberia and operated under the management of Frinton Shipbrokers. Management transferred to Pegasus Ocean Services in 1964. She was scrapped at Sakaide, Japan in December 1968.

== Sources ==
- Sawyer, L. A.; Mitchell, W. H. (1985). The Liberty Ships (2nd ed.). London: Lloyd's of London Press Ltd. ISBN 1-85044-049-2.
