= Frederick Reefs =

Reef in Queensland, Australia

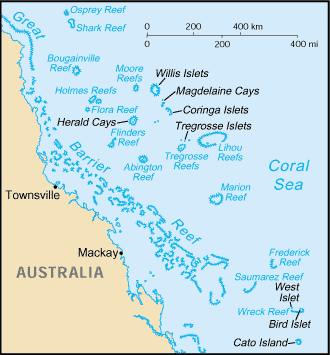
Map of the Coral Sea Islands

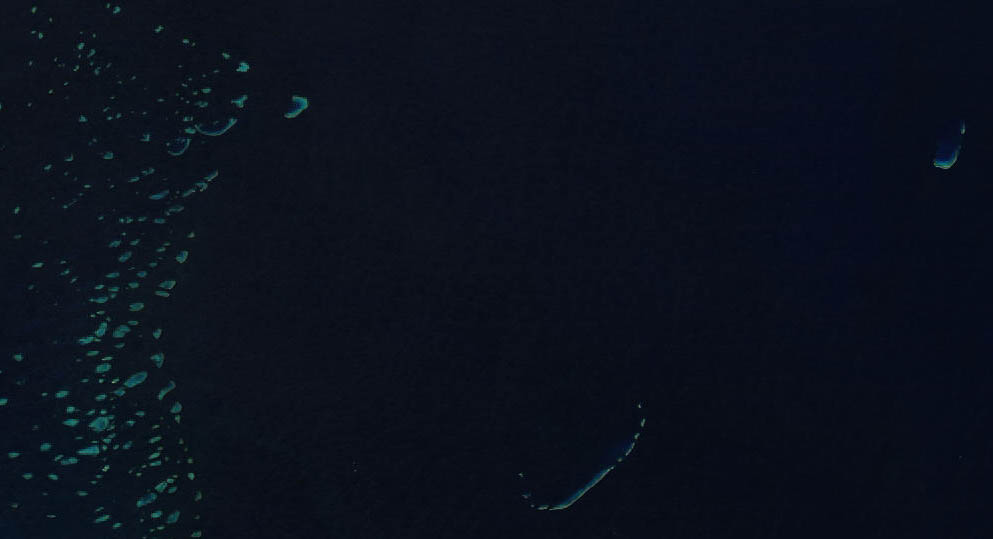
Satellite View of Saumarez reefs (center) and the Swains reef (Left part of the Great Barrier Reef) and Frederick Reefs (right)

Frederick Reef is in the Coral Sea Islands, over 220 nautical miles (410 km) northeast of Gladstone, Queensland. The reef was named in 1812 by Captain Joseph Savigny of Frederick, who first reported sighting the reef.

Frederick Reef is a small atoll with a large rock called Ridge Rock at the southern end, a sand cay called Observatory Cay, and a lighthouse at the northern end, which is the only permanently dry land, although there are a few other cays that can be awash at high tide.

The reefs are in a "J" shape that forms a semi-enclosed lagoon known as Anchorage Sound, with an opening on the North side. The complex measures about 10 by 4 kilometres (6.2 by 2.5 mi), with an area of 30 square kilometres (12 mi^{2}).

The reef is located in some deep water and drops sharply to over 2,500 metres (8,200 ft) on the western side.

== General description ==
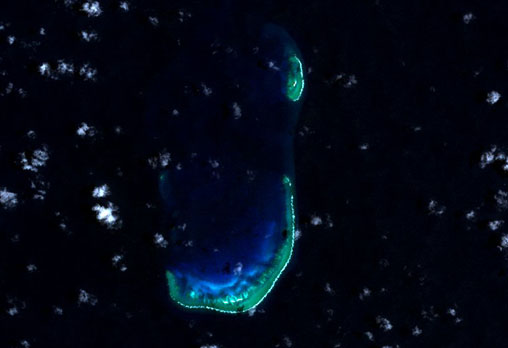
Satellite View of Frederick Reefs

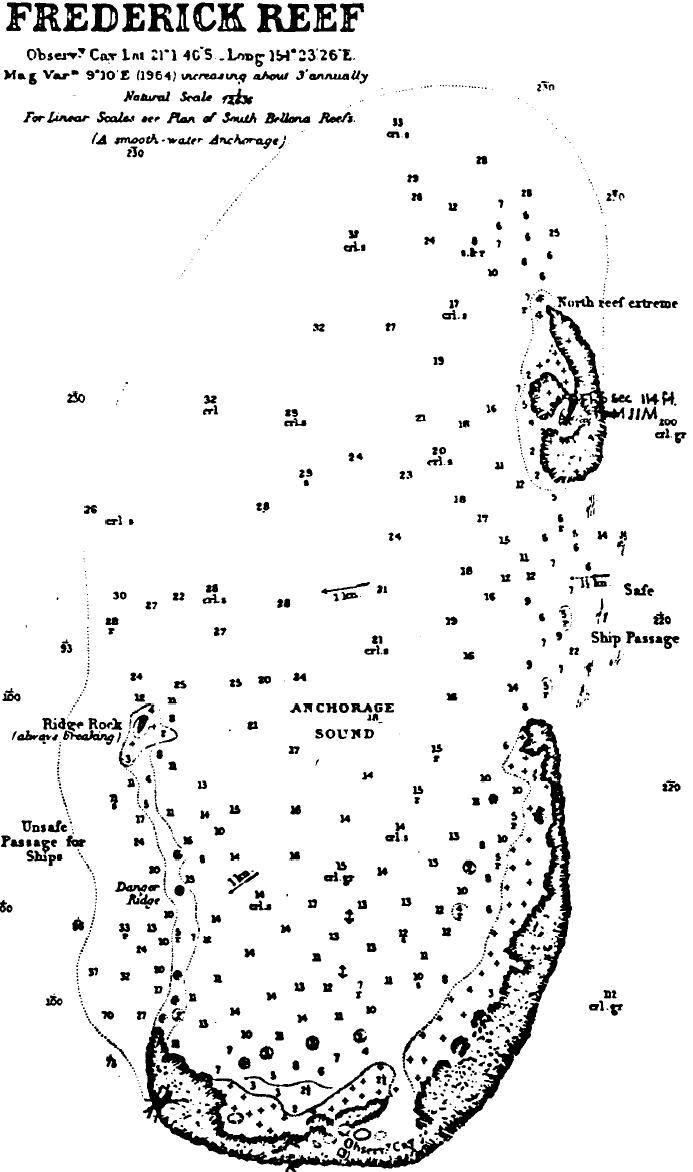
Chart of Frederick Reefs

The Frederick Reefs are a small group of remote reefs located beyond the southern reaches of the Great Barrier Reef,

The reef complex lies 540 kilometres (340 mi) due east from the city of Mackay, Queensland or 450 kilometres (280 mi) northeast of the city of Gladstone. The reefs are part of the southern reefs of the Coral Sea and as such are located in deep oceanic waters off the Coral Sea Shelf.

Aside from its coastal neighbours, it also lies 175 kilometres (109 mi) east from the Swains Reefs; the lower part of the Great Barrier Reef. Frederick Reefs is approximately 95 kilometres (59 mi) northeast of the Saumarez Reefs and 120 kilometres (75 mi) west of the northwest extremity of Kenn Reefs.

The reefs form a semi-enclosed lagoon or body of water known as Anchorage Sound; protected on most sides but open on the north side. On the southern side of the reef lies Observatory Cay, (21°02'S., 154°23'E.), the only permanently dry land, although there are a few of others cays that can be awash at high tide. Observatory Cay is approximately 1.8 metres (5.9 ft) above sea level; with a possible landing site on its northern side through a boat channel which leads in from North East through the reef. As the cay lies near the southern edge of the reef, the surf sometimes breaks over it in heavy gales.

Similar to other smaller sand cays and spits, the position of the sand spit can move. In 1983, it was reported that Observatory Cay lay about 750 metres (2,460 ft) west of the charted position. It has also been reported that the reef complex has at least 4 or 5 other sand cays on the southern reef which does not cover with water at high tide other than Observatory Cay.

A solitary leaning rock, 1.2 metres (3.9 ft) high, lies on the western extremity of the Observatory Cay southern reef, 2.4 kilometres (1.5 mi) west-northwest of Observatory Cay.

From Observatory Cay, the southern part of the reef extends to the north and northeast for 6.2 kilometres (3.9 mi).

Danger Ridge (21°00'S., 154°21'E.) is a narrow ridge connecting the western end of Observation Cay and Ridge Rock.

The North Reef Extreme is located to the north of Observatory Cay with its southern extremity about 3 kilometres (1.9 mi) north southern extremity of the Observatory Cay reef. It is about 2.7 kilometres (1.7 mi) long and about 900 metres (3,000 ft) wide.

A small cay ls located 900 metres (3,000 ft) south of Frederick Reef Light. The Light is located at the northeastern tip of the reef which is the only section permanently out of the water. The Light is accessible by boat only. It has a nominal range of 20 kilometres (12 mi).

== History ==
Frederick Reefs Lighthouse
- Location: North Cay; Frederick Reefs; Coral Sea islands Australia
- Coordinates: 20°56′06″S 154°24′00″E

Tower
- Constructed: ~ 1968 Built by Australian Department of Shipping and Transport. First constructed at Cleveland near Brisbane. Dismantled and reconstructed on the Reef by the crew of the Western Australian based Commonwealth Lighthouse Ship “ CLS Cape Pillar”
- Foundation: concrete base
- Construction: Stainless Steel tower
- Height: 33 metres (108 ft)
- Shape: two-stage cylindrical tower with balcony and light
- Markings: white tower
- Operator: Australian Maritime Safety Authority

Light
- First lit: 1968
- Focal height: 33 metres (108 ft)
- Range: 10 nautical miles (19 km; 12 mi)
- Characteristic: Fl W 5s.

=== Discovery ===
The reefs were discovered in 1812 by the Frederick. The reefs were described in the ship's log:

the north-east extremity of which is laid down in latitude 20 degrees 44 minutes, and longitude 150 degrees 32 minutes; it is of semi-circular shape, and extends as far south as 21 degrees 2 minutes, and appears to be nearly twenty miles wide.

=== Shipwreck of Royal Charlotte ===
On 29 April 1825, Royal Charlotte arrived in Sydney from England with a load of convicts. The ship then took on detachments of the 20th, 46th, and 49th Regiments for transport to India by Batavia. On 11 June, the ship ran aground on Frederick Reefs; the masts were cut away to steady her while the crew and soldiers moved to shore with water and provisions before she sank. Only two lives were lost. A party took the surviving longboat and travelled to Moreton Bay, arriving in July and causing the brig Amity to be dispatched to collect survivors.

The discovery of the wreck was announced in January 2012.

=== Grounding of USS Tiru ===
On 2 November 1966, the United States submarine USS Tiru departed from Brisbane for Subic Bay. On 4 November, the submarine ran aground on Frederick Reef. For two days, the submarine attempted to back off the reef under her own power, but was unsuccessful. On 6 November, Australian destroyer HMAS Vendetta and civilian tugboat Carlock arrived to assist the salvage of Tiru. The submarine was towed to Brisbane, where she was drydocked for emergency repairs and damage assessment.

Following temporary repairs to her sonar dome, outer hull, and keel, the submarine gingerly made her way from Australia to the United States Naval Ship Repair Facility, Yokosuka, Japan. En route, Tiru called at Guam to provision alongside Proteus (AS-19) and pick up new crew members. Arriving at Yokosuka on 29 November, the submarine entered drydock for restricted availability.

=== Grounding of Jhansi Ki Rani ===
On 23 April 1986, Jhansi Ki Rani, an India-flagged bulk carrier departed from Newcastle, New South Wales for Japan with 74,000 tonnes of coal on board. The route for the voyage had been planned and plotted by the Second Officer, approved by the Master, and was to take the vessel 10 nautical miles (19 km) east of Frederick Reef sometime on 26 April.

During the Second Officer's watch, constant rain had reduced visibility from 10 kilometres (6.2 mi) to 3 kilometres (1.9 mi). At 1515, an object was detected on radar, 17.5 nautical miles (32.4 km) away to port. It was assumed that this was the Frederick Reefs Lighthouse, but was actually another ship, MV Fort Resolution. Two hours later, another radar echo was picked up, 9 nautical miles (17 km) away. While attempting to clarify the indistinct radar signal, it became obscured by rain clutter, then vanished. Assumed to be a ship, the lookout was instructed to keep watch off the starboard bow. The ship's Master arrived on the bridge at 1725, to confirm the progress of the voyage and to prepare for the passing of Frederick Reefs.

Shortly after this, the Chief Officer and lookout both reported a white line close ahead; waves breaking over the edge of the reef. The ship was ordered to swing hard to port, but did not swing far enough to clear the southern edge of the reef, running aground 5.7 nautical miles (10.6 km) from the tower. The engines were stopped, and at 1736 were put full astern in an attempt to pull the ship off the reef. After almost two hours, the failed attempts ceased.

Some oil pollution was observed after the grounding. This pollution was attributed to the forward oil fuel deep tank, which was damaged. All other fuel tanks were situated aft and were intact .

The vessel was recovered and refloated on 4 May, and after being anchored for inspection, was towed to Singapore for repairs, then put up for auction with her cargo of coal.

== See also ==
- List of lighthouses in the Coral Sea Islands
- List of islands of Australia
