= List of lighthouses in the Coral Sea Islands =

This is a list of lighthouses in Coral Sea Islands.

== Lighthouses ==
Name	Image	Year built	Location & coordinates	Class of light	Focal height	NGA number	Admiralty number	Range nml
Bougainville Reef Lighthouse	Image	1943 est.	Bougainville Reef; 15°29′18.0″S 147°07′06.0″E	Fl W 5s.	15 metres (49 ft)	9884	K3206	10
East Diamond Island Lighthouse	Image	2006	East Diamond Island; 17°25′20.0″S 151°04′32.7″E	Fl W 5s.	29 metres (95 ft)	9887	K3206.7	17
Frederick Reefs Lighthouse	Image	~ 1990	Frederick Reefs; 20°56′06.0″S 154°24′00.0″E	Fl W 5s.	33 metres (108 ft)	10220	K3016	10
Lihou Reef Lighthouse	Image	1999	Lihou Reef; 17°08′28.0″S 152°08′21.2″E	Fl W 10s.	33 metres (108 ft)	9886.5	K3206.6	19
Saumarez Reefs Lighthouse	Image	n/a	Saumarez Reefs; 21°38′13.2″S 153°45′33.0″E	Fl (4) 20s.	70 metres (230 ft)	10300	K3015	10
Willis Island Lighthouse	Image	n/a	Willis Island (Coral Sea); 16°17′13.9″S 149°57′52.4″E	2 F G	n/a	9886	K3206.55	n/a

== See also ==
- List of lighthouses in Australia
