= Willis Island =

Australian island in the Coral Sea

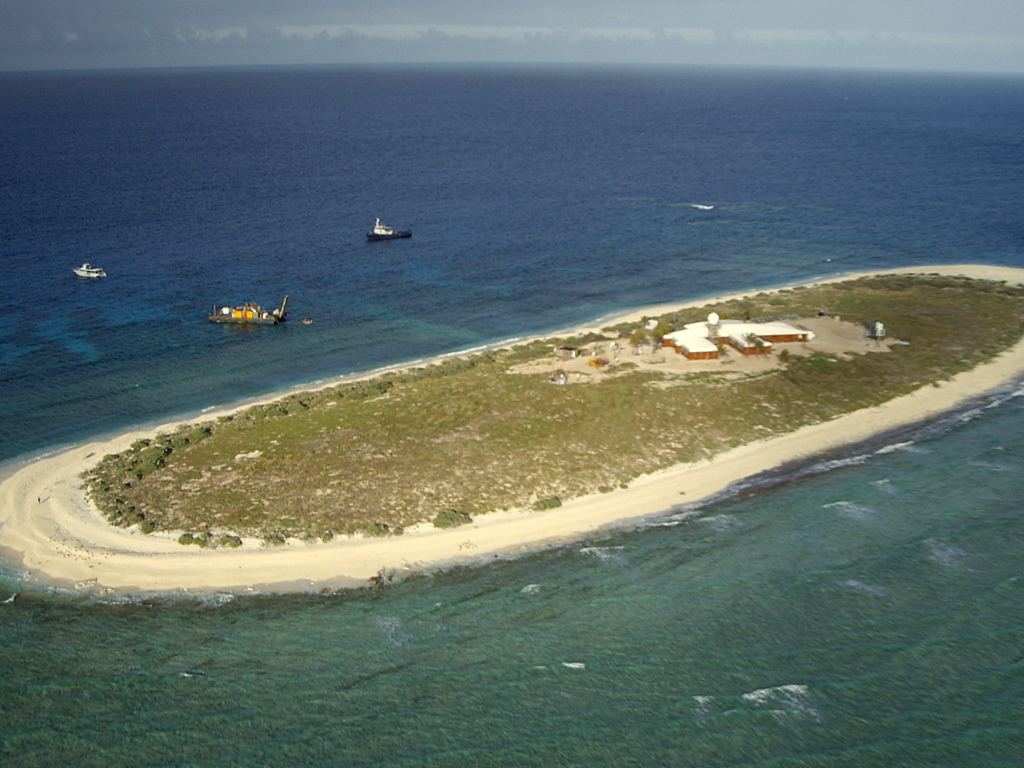
- Aerial view of Willis Island in 2006
- Interactive map of Willis Island

Geography
- Location: Coral Sea
- Coordinates: 16°17′15″S 149°57′52″E
- Total islands: 1
- Area: 7.7 ha (19 acres)
- Length: 500 m (1600 ft)
- Width: 150 m (490 ft)
- Highest elevation: 9 m (30 ft)

Administration
- Australia

Demographics
- Population: 4 (2018)

Willis Island is the only permanently inhabited island in the Coral Sea Islands Territory, an external territory of Australia, located beyond the Great Barrier Reef in the Coral Sea. The island is located some 450 kilometres (280 mi) east of Cairns, Queensland. It is the southernmost of the Willis Islets, a group of three islands which with their associated sandy cays stretch in a NNE to SSW line for about 12 kilometres (7.5 mi). Willis Island itself is aligned NW to SE and is about 500 metres (1,600 ft) long by 150 metres (490 ft) wide, 7.7 hectares (19 acres) in area, rising to about 9 metres (30 ft) above sea level.

== Weather monitoring station ==
Willis Island Lighthouse
- Location: Willis Island, Queensland, Australia
- Coordinates: 16°17′16″S 149°57′53″E

Tower
- Construction: metal skeletal tower
- Shape: quadrangular tower
- Power source: solar power
- Operator: Australian Maritime Safety Authority

Light
- Characteristic: (2) F G

The Australian Bureau of Meteorology has a weather station on the island. There are usually four weather observers, one of whom is Officer-in-Charge, and one Technical Officer (electronic engineering) living on the island. The four staff on the island rotate every six months. During the shift, resupply of the island also occurs.

=== History ===
The Willis Island weather monitoring station was established in 1921 and equipped with a radio transmitter in order to provide a cyclone early warning service for Queensland. The first officer in charge was John King Davis.

==== Cyclones ====
On 2 February 2011, sometime shortly after 08:30 AEST, the eye of Cyclone Yasi moved directly over Willis Island as a Category 5 tropical cyclone. Four station staff had been evacuated the previous day. A wind gust speed of 185 kilometres per hour (115 mph) was recorded by the weather station equipment before the anemometer failed. The barometric pressure fell to an exceptionally low 937.9 hectopascals (703.5 mmHg). Around 9:00 am, radar data was disrupted. Roughly an hour later, communication with the island was completely cut off. The cyclone was so strong it altered the shape of the island and cleared much of its vegetation.

Limited services were restored on 17 February 2011. A Bureau of Meteorology spokeswoman later said the core building sustained minor damage to the roof, deck covering and one of the solar panels. "The radome which protects the radar was completely destroyed and the radar itself sustained damage and needed to be replaced," she said. The associated storm surge also damaged the power generator, sewage system and desalination equipment. Operation of the weather monitoring station was restored on 12 December 2011.

Meteorology staff on the island were evacuated again in 2023 by a Royal Australian Navy (RAN) warship before Cyclone Jasper passed through the area on 11 December. Little damage was caused to the island and the BOM staff returned eleven days after they were evacuated.

=== Infrastructure ===
==== Past infrastructure ====
Up to 2004 most of the infrastructure constructed in either 1950 or 1968 still existed. Maintenance and refurbishment had been an ongoing costly process. The small parcel of land (total island is 7.7 hectares) accommodated eight buildings of varying structure as follows:

- Main building housing recreation, kitchen/dining, sleeping, office and equipment room constructed in 1950
- Main store constructed in 1950
- Laundry building constructed in 1950
- Bunker/Cyclone Shelter constructed in 1950
- Generator building constructed in 1968
- Fire pump building constructed in 1968
- Flammable liquids bunker constructed in 1968
- Balloon filling and hydrogen storage building constructed 1950 (condemned)

Personal living accommodation was provided in a barracks-like wing between the meteorological office and the kitchen-living room area. Meteorological equipment included a defined equipment enclosure and a 7-metre-high (23 ft) radar tower plus dome. Other equipment included a desalination plant and enviro-cycle sewage treatment plant.

==== Current infrastructure ====
From 2005, the following new facilities and services have been constructed:

- Meteorological office, mess area, accommodation, recreational area, powerhouse
- Hydrogen generator building and gas storage, including associated site works
- Relocated fuel storage tanks to a new concrete bunded diesel fuel area
- Underground services related to communications, power distribution, water, sewage and fire hose reel services
- Relocated satellite dishes and radar tower
- Refurbished salt water pump building

Accommodation facilities caters for four permanent staff and up to 10 visiting personnel.

Meteorological equipment includes a defined equipment enclosure and a 7-metre-high (23 ft) radar tower plus dome. Other equipment includes a desalination plant and enviro-cycle sewage treatment plant. Power generation comprises a hybrid system of a diesel generator combined with a wind generator and solar power. Rainwater harvesting has not been implemented due to the high level of marine bird life and guano deposits.

=== Recreation ===
The station has a recreation room which includes amenities such as a pool table, darts and table tennis, along with an outside sporting area and a home gym. There are also opportunities for recreational fishing.

A substantial library caters for all tastes. Two satellite television systems enable reception of Australian Channel 10 and the ABC, and free-to-air transmissions from countries such as Malaysia and Indonesia. Programming includes the American television channels CNN and MTV and an extensive video library completes the passive entertainment options.

Occasional amateur radio operations occur in the Willis islets. Under DXCC rules Willis is considered to be a separate "entity" (equivalent to country) for award credit. A major DX-pedition visited for several weeks in October 2008 (VK9DWX). Another operated here in November 2015 (VK9WA). Amateur radio operator VK4WXW/VU2WXW "Sands" operated as VK9WX on Willis from Oct 2022 to April 2023. He operated again from there in 2026.

=== Hazard reduction ===
In the past, landfill was buried on the island, and occasionally high winds and heavy seas from a cyclone would uncover parts of the waste. A major clean-up campaign was conducted in 2004 and 2005 to protect the sensitive areas such as the coral cays and sand dunes.

Today, all waste generated on the island, as well as any debris that washes ashore, is placed in bins and shipped back on the staff exchange vessel for appropriate disposal on the mainland.

Severe Tropical Cyclone Yasi uncovered a landfill site on the island, which was found to include some asbestos containing material (ACM). The area was remediated and all waste was removed from the island.

Three formal Occupational Health and Safety investigations on Willis Island have been undertaken by independent assessors – GHD (2007 and 2011) and Parsons Brinkerhoff (April 2011 – after TC Yasi). These investigations found no significant potential for exposure to asbestos fibre for employees stationed on Willis Island.

Occasionally old asbestos cement sheet washes up on Willis Island and is collected and bagged before being transported back to the mainland where it is disposed of in line with the Queensland Government's EPA legislative requirements. Full safety equipment is used.

Staff generate their own supply of hydrogen for use in weather balloons. Prior to 1994, a chemical process to meet hydrogen needs was used. This process produced a toxic residue that was a danger to the local birdlife. Because of this danger, a safer "electrolytic converter" is now used to break down water into hydrogen and oxygen.

== Birdlife ==
The most common inhabitants are wedge-tailed shearwaters, sooty terns and common and black noddies. Their numbers are usually quite high and bird cries continue day and night on the island. Several species of booby migrate through the Island including masked, brown and red-footed boobies, and also the lesser frigatebird. Crested terns are also seen to migrate, although not as often. Other birds mentioned by John King Davis are the buff-banded rail as a resident, wood sandpiper, and sacred kingfisher and red-tailed tropicbird as occasional visitors.

== Climate ==
Willis Island experiences a moist tropical savanna climate (Köppen: Aw, Trewartha: Awha), with a hot and oppressive wet season from November to April, and a warm, muggy dry season from May to October, typical for most of Far North Queensland. Warm, windy and humid weather predominates the island even during the winter, with the average temperature being 26.6 °C (79.9 °F), but the long dry season reduces average annual precipitation, which is 1073.4 mm (42.3 inches).

Temperatures are moderated in all seasons by the warm Coral Sea, which eliminates extreme weather. The absolute temperature range is very narrow: from 35.2 °C (95.4 °F) on 9 February 2002 to 18.4 °C (65.1 °F) on 28 June 2007. In addition, diurnal temperature range is limited in comparison to the city of Cairns on mainland Australia. High temperatures are similar year-round, but Cairns averages cooler nights in the wet and dry seasons, along with lowered humidity. Temperature is slightly cooler in the dry season during the day and night: averages range from 28.5 °C (83.3 °F) in February to 24.4 °C (75.9 °F) in July and August.

Precipitation is brought on by thunderstorms from northeasterly trade winds during the wet season, while the island is too far north for cold fronts from the Tasman Sea to arrive and deliver precipitation. Due to the "hit-or-miss" nature of these thunderstorms, precipitation is extremely variable in the summer. Only 1.0 mm (0.04 inches) was recorded in November 1992, but an astounding 1484.8 mm (58.46 inches) was recorded in March 1997, more than the annual average in just one month. Occasionally, cyclones can occur in the summer, and are more common than on the mainland, as average wind speeds are higher. Winters are much drier, bottoming at 7.1 mm (0.28 inches) in September.

Climate data for Willis Island, Coral Sea Islands, Australia (1991–2020 normals, extremes 1930–present)
Month	Jan	Feb	Mar	Apr	May	Jun	Jul	Aug	Sep	Oct	Nov	Dec	Year
Record high °C (°F)	35.1 (95.2)	35.2 (95.4)	33.8 (92.8)	33.9 (93.0)	31.5 (88.7)	32.2 (90.0)	29.8 (85.6)	30.0 (86.0)	31.6 (88.9)	32.4 (90.3)	33.6 (92.5)	34.8 (94.6)	35.2 (95.4)
Mean daily maximum °C (°F)	30.8 (87.4)	30.8 (87.4)	29.9 (85.8)	29.0 (84.2)	27.8 (82.0)	26.7 (80.1)	26.2 (79.2)	26.4 (79.5)	27.4 (81.3)	28.6 (83.5)	29.8 (85.6)	30.8 (87.4)	28.7 (83.6)
Daily mean °C (°F)	28.5 (83.3)	28.5 (83.3)	27.8 (82.0)	27.6 (81.7)	26.0 (78.8)	24.9 (76.8)	24.4 (75.9)	24.4 (75.9)	25.3 (77.5)	26.3 (79.3)	27.4 (81.3)	28.4 (83.1)	26.6 (79.9)
Mean daily minimum °C (°F)	26.1 (79.0)	26.2 (79.2)	25.7 (78.3)	25.2 (77.4)	24.2 (75.6)	23.1 (73.6)	22.5 (72.5)	22.4 (72.3)	23.1 (73.6)	24.0 (75.2)	25.0 (77.0)	25.9 (78.6)	24.5 (76.0)
Record low °C (°F)	20.7 (69.3)	20.9 (69.6)	20.8 (69.4)	18.9 (66.0)	19.9 (67.8)	16.9 (62.4)	17.2 (63.0)	16.4 (61.5)	18.6 (65.5)	18.9 (66.0)	20.9 (69.6)	21.1 (70.0)	16.4 (61.5)
Average rainfall mm (inches)	174.0 (6.85)	197.2 (7.76)	246.3 (9.70)	98.7 (3.89)	72.5 (2.85)	44.5 (1.75)	42.5 (1.67)	18.2 (0.72)	7.1 (0.28)	17.6 (0.69)	49.4 (1.94)	99.9 (3.93)	1,067.9 (42.03)
Average rainy days (≥ 1 mm)	11.7	11.7	14.4	9.5	7.3	6.5	4.4	3.4	1.5	2.1	4.4	7.6	84.5
Average afternoon relative humidity (%)	74	78	76	74	72	70	67	67	66	67	69	70	71
Average dew point °C (°F)	24.0 (75.2)	24.7 (76.5)	23.8 (74.8)	22.4 (72.3)	20.8 (69.4)	19.4 (66.9)	18.0 (64.4)	18.3 (64.9)	19.2 (66.6)	20.3 (68.5)	21.9 (71.4)	23.2 (73.8)	21.3 (70.4)
Source 1: Bureau of Meteorology (1991–2020 averages)
Source 2: Extremes 1930–present

== See also ==
- List of islands of Australia
- List of lighthouses in the Coral Sea Islands
