= USS Tiru =

Submarine of the United States

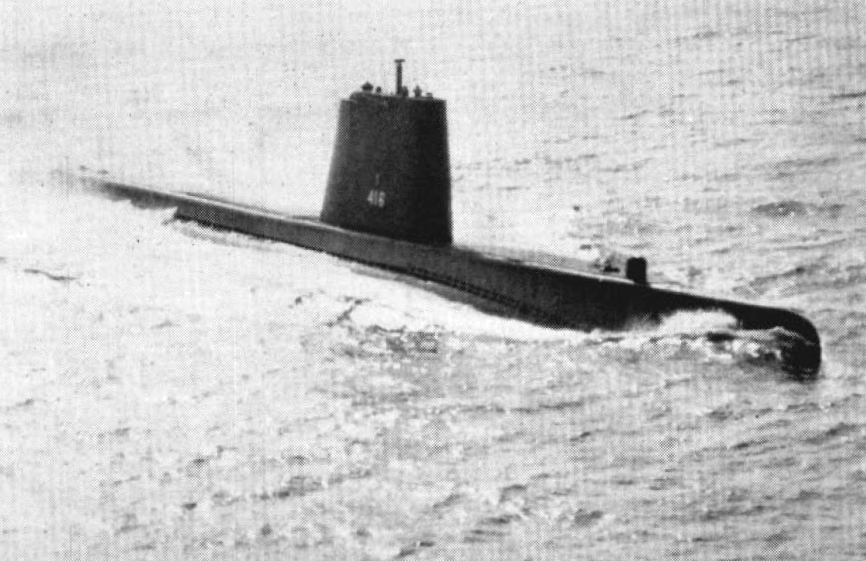
- USS Tiru after Greater Underwater Propulsion Power Program (GUPPY III) conversion.

History

United States
- Name: USS Tiru
- Builder: Mare Island Naval Shipyard
- Laid down: 17 April 1944
- Launched: 16 September 1947
- Commissioned: 1 September 1948
- Decommissioned: 1 July 1975
- Stricken: 1 July 1975
- Fate: Sunk as a target off Cape Hatteras, North Carolina, 19 July 1979

General characteristics (Completed as GUPPY II)
- Class & type: Balao-class diesel-electric submarine
- Displacement: 1,870 long tons (1,900 t) surfaced; 2,440 tons (2,480 t) submerged
- Length: 307 ft (94 m)
- Beam: 27 ft 4 in (8.33 m)
- Draft: 17 ft (5.2 m)
- Propulsion: 3 × Fairbanks-Morse Model 38D8-1/8 10-cylinder opposed piston diesel engines, equipped with a snorkel, driving electrical generators; 1 × 184 cell, 1 × 68 cell, and 2 × 126 cell GUPPY-type batteries (total 504 cells); 2 × low-speed direct-drive General Electric electric motors; two propellers
- Speed: Surfaced: 18.0 knots (20.7 mph; 33.3 km/h) maximum; 13.5 knots (15.5 mph; 25.0 km/h) cruising; Submerged: 16.0 knots (18.4 mph; 29.6 km/h) for 1/2 hour; 9.0 knots (10.4 mph; 16.7 km/h) snorkeling; 3.5 knots (4.0 mph; 6.5 km/h) cruising
- Range: 15,000 nmi (28,000 km) surfaced at 11 knots (13 mph; 20 km/h)
- Endurance: 48 hours at 4 knots (5 mph; 7 km/h) submerged
- Test depth: 400 ft (120 m)
- Complement: 9–10 officers; 5 petty officers; 70 enlisted men
- Sensors & processing systems: WFA active sonar; JT passive sonar; Mk 106 torpedo fire control system
- Armament: 10 × 21 inches (530 mm) torpedo tubes; (six forward, four aft)

General characteristics (Guppy III)
- Class & type: none
- Displacement: 1,975 tons (2,007 t) surfaced; 2,450 tons (2,489 t) submerged
- Length: 319 ft 6 in (97.38 m)
- Beam: 27 ft 4 in (8.33 m)
- Draft: 17 ft (5.2 m)
- Speed: Surfaced: 17.2 knots (31.9 km/h) maximum; 12.2 knots (22.6 km/h) cruising; Submerged: 14.5 knots (26.9 km/h) for 1/2 hour; 6.2 knots (11.5 km/h) snorkeling; 3.7 knots (6.9 km/h) cruising
- Range: 15,900 nautical miles (29,400 km; 18,300 mi) surfaced at 8.5 knots (10 mph; 16 km/h)
- Endurance: 36 hours at 3 knots (6 km/h) submerged
- Complement: 8–10 officers; 5 petty officers; 70-80 enlisted men
- Sensors & processing systems: BQS-4 active search sonar; BQR-2B passive search sonar; BQG-4 passive attack sonar

USS Tiru (SS-416), a Balao-class submarine, was a vessel of the United States Navy named for the tiru, a member of the lizardfish family.

Tiru—laid down on 17 April 1944 at Vallejo, California, by the Mare Island Navy Yard—remained uncompleted for three years as a result of the curtailment of the submarine building program at the end of World War II. In the fall of 1947, the Navy decided to complete Tiru as a "GUPPY II" (Greater Underwater Propulsive Power) snorkel boat. Her altered design incorporated improvements resulting from the Navy's recent combat experience and German technical development.

Tiru was launched on 16 September 1947; sponsored by Mrs. John P. Cromwell, the widow of Captain John P. Cromwell, and commissioned on 1 September 1948. Tiru was once under the command of future FBI Director L. Patrick Gray of Watergate notoriety.

== Service history ==
=== 1948–1959 ===
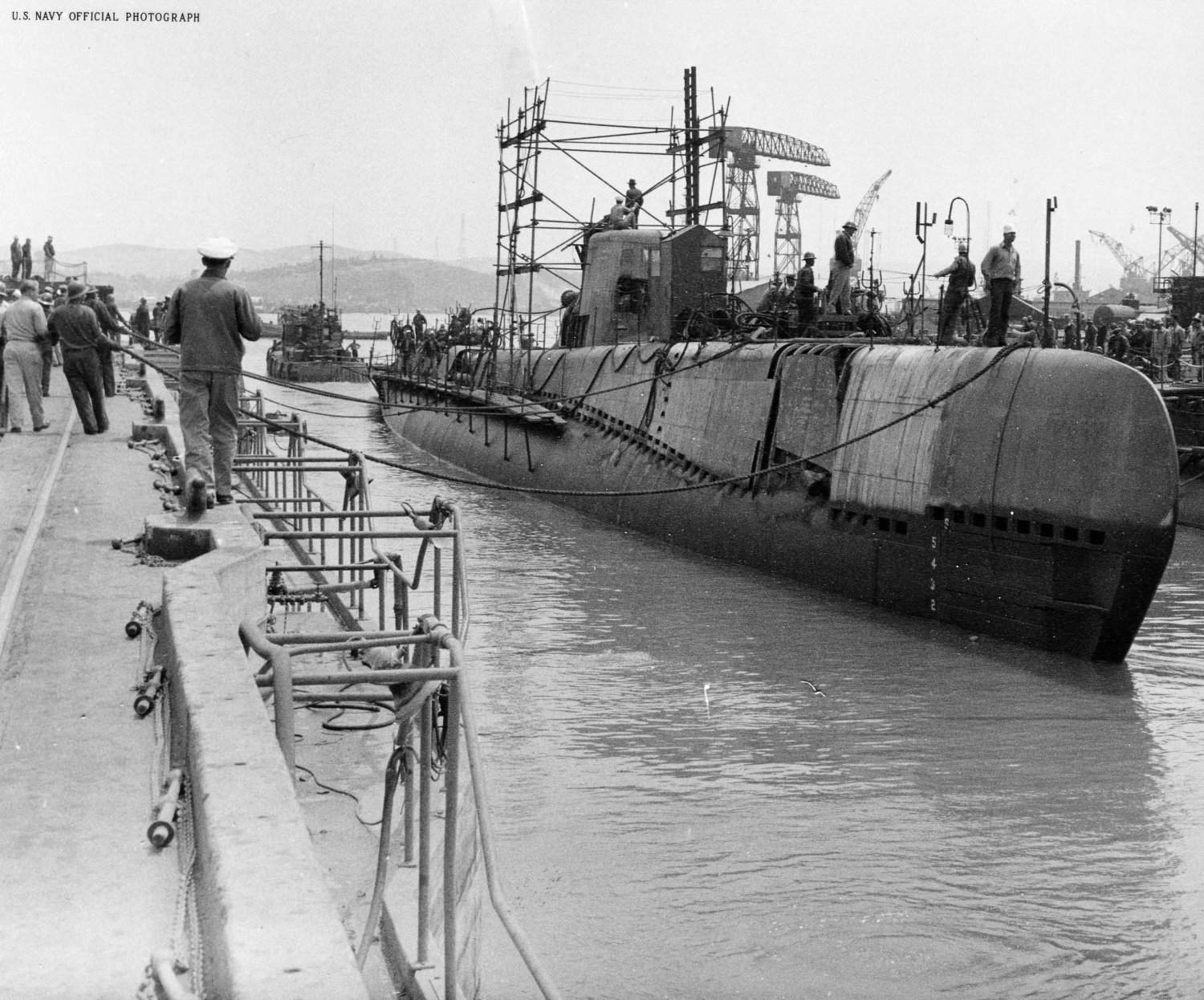
Tiru leaving dry dock at Mare Island Navy Yard in 1948.

Tiru conducted training and trials off the West Coast before heading for Hawaii on 10 February 1949. Homeported at Pearl Harbor and attached to Submarine Squadron 12 (SubRon 12), the "GUPPY" submarine operated in Hawaiian waters for a year and one-half before conducting a 12-day snorkel voyage from Pearl Harbor to the West Coast which ended upon her arrival at San Diego on 27 June 1950.

On 9 June 1951, Tiru sailed for the Far East and her first Western Pacific (WestPac) deployment. While in Asiatic waters, she operated in support of United Nations forces engaged in the Korean War. Then, after departing Yokosuka, Japan, on 26 November, the warship arrived at Pearl Harbor on 6 December. Her operations in the Hawaiian area continued until 24 February 1952, when Tiru got underway for her second WestPac deployment.

Between 1952 and 1959, Tiru conducted four more WestPac deployments, interspersed with local operations—providing services for antisubmarine warfare (ASW) exercises and conducting type-training. Operating with the 7th Fleet, her seventh WestPac tour lasted from 1 January to 17 April 1959.

=== 1959–1965 ===
Tiru returned to Pearl Harbor for a major overhaul, entering the shipyard on 4 May 1959 for a fleet rehabilitation and modernization (FRAM) conversion to a "Guppy III". In the course of the work, the ship took on a new and different external appearance. Her hull was lengthened by 12 feet (3.7 m); she acquired a new conning tower, 5 feet (1.5 m) longer than its predecessor; and a fiberglass sail was added. Internally, increased sonar and ordnance equipment greatly enhanced the ship's capabilities in those key areas. On the last day of the year 1959, Tiru emerged from the overhaul a virtually "new" ship.

From 1 January to 10 November 1960, Tiru conducted local operations out of Pearl Harbor to prove the worth of the FRAM/Guppy III conversion. After testing and honing her capabilities, the submarine departed Pearl Harbor on 10 November for another 7th Fleet deployment. She later returned to Pearl Harbor on 10 May 1961 upon completion of her eighth WestPac cruise.

Local operations out of her home port occupied the rest of 1961 and the first few months of 1962. She again was deployed to WestPac in March and April before returning to Hawaiian waters on 3 May. The next month, the ship operated with a carrier task force on ASW "hunter-killer" exercises. While the submarine was engaged in a firing exercise, a torpedo malfunction in her after torpedo room seriously damaged the compartment, and 18 men were overcome by toxic gases. Quick reaction averted a more serious tragedy and earned four crew members — one officer (Lieutenant Commander W. Earle Smith Jr.) and three enlisted men — the Navy and Marine Corps Medal.

=== 1966 ===
The ship conducted three more WestPac deployments through 1965 before she returned to a schedule of local operations. Tiru entered another major overhaul on 6 December 1965—one which saw the installation of a masking system to cover the ship's own noise while snorkeling. Further internal alterations improved both her fighting capacity and her habitability. She conducted sea trials until 14 June 1966 when she departed Hawaii for the Naval Torpedo Station at Keyport, Washington, for an alignment and testing of her weapon system. The submarine departed the West Coast on 9 July, bound for Hawaiian waters, and made port at Pearl Harbor nine days later to commence pre-deployment operations.

After a 16-day passage from Hawaii, Tiru arrived at Brisbane, Australia, on 12 October. Three days later, she sailed to commence ASW exercises in the Coral Sea with warships of the Australian, British, New Zealand, and United States Navies. The nine-day exercise provided for submarine patrol, reconnaissance, and attack operations against both carrier and destroyer task forces before the submarine returned to Brisbane on 26 October.

On 2 November, Tiru got underway for Subic Bay, Philippine Islands. One day out, the submarine ran aground on Frederick Reef. For two anxious days and nights, Tiru attempted to extricate herself from the predicament by backing off under her own power, but to no avail. On 6 November, civilian tugboat Carlock and Australian destroyer HMAS Vendetta came to the rescue, arriving on the scene and commencing salvage operations under the direction of a 7th Fleet salvage officer. Returning to Brisbane, Tiru was drydocked at South Brisbane Dockyard for emergency repairs and damage estimates.

Following temporary repairs to her sonar dome, outer hull, and keel, the submarine gingerly made her way from Australia to the United States Naval Ship Repair Facility, Yokosuka, Japan. En route, Tiru called at Guam to provision alongside Proteus and pick up new crew members. Arriving at Yokosuka on 29 November, the submarine entered drydock for restricted availability.

=== 1967–1970 ===
Once repaired, Tiru left Yokosuka on 9 January 1967 for Chin Hae, South Korea, and while in transit provided services for an Iwakuni-based patrol plane squadron. Operating with Republic of Korea (ROK) ASW forces from 15 January to 17 January, Tiru arrived back at Yokosuka on 22 January for upkeep. From 7 February to 20 March, the submarine conducted special operations before returning for further upkeep prior to a "Yankee Station" deployment off Vietnam. She later operated with Nationalist Chinese forces on ASW exercises; conducted additional special operations; and again provided services for patrol plane squadrons based at Iwakuni, before returning to Hawaii on 15 May.

Spending the remainder of the year 1967 on local operations out of Pearl Harbor, Tiru commenced the year 1968 as a unit of Submarine Division 72 (SubDiv 72), SubRon 7, and Submarine Flotilla 5 (SubFlot 5). On 16 May, the submarine was shifted to operational control of Commander, 7th Fleet, with her home port changed to Yokosuka, Japan. Departing the western Pacific on 4 October after a tour which had included a transit through the Vietnam War zone, Tiru returned to the West Coast; and her home port was changed to San Francisco, California, while she became a unit of SubDiv 52, SubRon 5, SubFlot 1.

Overhauls and local operations occupied the ship until 12 November 1969, when Tiru sailed west for another WestPac deployment. Transferred to the command of the Commander, 7th Fleet, on 6 December, the submarine arrived at Yokosuka on 10 December. Five days later, she got underway for special operations which took her into 1970.

Tiru participated in Exercise "Sea Rover," with United States and Australian naval units, before heading home for the United States at the conclusion of her WestPac deployment. While approaching Guam for voyage repairs, she routinely copied the evening weather broadcast which was accompanied by an urgent alert notifying the ship of a search and rescue (SAR) operation underway to look for and rescue survivors of a small craft which had been adrift for two days in a heavy sea. An extensive search by Guam-based SAR forces had thus far turned up nothing, but Tiru located the five people—two of them Japanese nationals—and rescued them, despite darkness and high seas. Soon after Tiru's arrival at Guam on 14 April 1970, the Japanese consul visited the submarine to express his government's appreciation for the ship's rescue mission.

=== 1970–1975 ===
Subsequently, arriving at San Diego on 8 May after a brief period at Pearl Harbor, Tiru conducted local operations, transited to San Francisco to undergo an overhaul at Hunters Point Naval Shipyard and returned to San Diego prior to being transferred to the Atlantic Fleet on 1 August 1970. Underway on 6 August for Charleston, South Carolina, her new home port, Tiru called at Acapulco, Mexico; Rodman, Canal Zone; transited the Panama Canal; and visited Kingston, Jamaica, before reaching Charleston harbor on 2 September. For the remainder of the year, the ship conducted local operations, provided services, and underwent type training—activities which continued into 1972. Later transferred to SubFlot 6, SubRon 4, SubDiv 41, during 1972, Tiru operated in the Caribbean Sea and off the lower East Coast of the United States, with two deployments to European waters, into 1975.

On 1 July 1975, Tiru was decommissioned and struck from the Navy list to be sold to the Turkish government. An American arms embargo imposed on Turkey as a result of the Cyprus tensions between Greece and Turkey delayed the sale, however, even though negotiations and arrangements had been well into the planning stages. The sale was never completed, and on 19 July 1979 Tiru was sunk as a target by the submarine Silversides at 36°N 73°W, about 200 nautical miles (370 km; 230 mi) off Cape Hatteras, North Carolina.

Tiru was the last submarine of the Balao class to be commissioned, and was also the last to be decommissioned. Tiru was also the last submarine of a World War II vintage design to be decommissioned by the U.S. Navy.

== Trivia ==
At the time of her decommissioning, Tiru was the oldest submarine in service with the US Navy. She held this distinction for only four days following the decommissioning of USS Tigrone (SS-419) on 27 June 1975. She was also the last unit of the Balao class to be decommissioned.

== Awards ==
- China Service Medal
- National Defense Service Medal with star
- Armed Forces Expeditionary Medal with two stars
- Vietnam Service Medal with three campaign stars
