= Frederick (1807 ship) =

Ship wrecked at Cape Flinders on Stanley Island, Australia

Coordinates: 14°07′48″S 144°14′13″E

History

United Kingdom
- Name: Frederick
- Owner: Palmer & Co.
- Port of registry: Calcutta
- Launched: 1807, Batavia
- Fate: Wrecked in 1818

General characteristics
- Tons burthen: 210 (bm)
- Propulsion: Sail
- Complement: 41
- Armament: 2 guns

Frederick was a sailing ship built in 1807 at Batavia. She made four voyages to Australia and was wrecked at Cape Flinders on Stanley Island, Queensland, Australia in 1818.

== Career ==
Frederick made four voyages to Australia transporting merchandise, passengers, and on each occasion, some military convicts. In 1815 she carried eight escaped convicts that had stowed away on Archduke Charles when she had left from Port Jackson for Canton.

Captain Joseph Savigny arrived at Port Jackson from Bengal on 6 December 1812. Frederick was carrying merchandise. She left on 10 February 1813 for the Derwent River. She left the Derwent and returned to Port Jackson on 21 April. She left for Bengal on 19 May.

On her way to Port Jackson, Captain Savigny in 1812 discovered a reef that was named after her. The Frederick Reefs are located in the Coral Sea Islands, over 220 nautical miles (410 km) northeast of Gladstone, Queensland. The reefs were described in the ship's log:

the north-east extremity of which is laid down in latitude 20 degrees 44 minutes, and longitude 150 degrees 32 minutes; it is of semi-circular shape, and extends as far south as 21 degrees 2 minutes, and appears to be nearly twenty miles wide.

Captain William Duncan and Frederick arrived at Port Jackson on 18 June 1814, from Bengal, carrying merchandise. She left 22 July to return to Bengal.

Captain John Williams and Frederick arrived at Port Jackson from Bengal on 27 April 1815, with merchandise. She left for Calcutta on 11 June.

Captain Williams and Frederick again arrived at Port Jackson on 23 June 1816 from Bengal, with merchandise. She left for Calcutta on 1 August.

== Loss ==
Frederick was under the command of Captain John Williams when she left Hobart, Tasmania on 27 June 1818 bound for Mauritius. She was carrying sheep and cattle but these died from heat at the Percy Isles off the east coast of Queensland. Williams ordered the crew to collect spars to take to Mauritius instead and it was at this time that the ship was wrecked at Cape Flinders in August.

Two boats were launched and shortly after the ship broke in two. In one boat were the master, two men, and two boys while the long boat carried the remaining twenty-three of the crew.

Duke of Wellington, which had been travelling with Frederick for much of their journey, rescued Williams and the four other crew in his boat. The long boat was not seen again and one can only assumed that the twenty-three surviving crew drowned, or were killed by aborigines. Williams had sailed with a sixteen-year-old girl whom he had bought from her father, much to the scandal of the colonial community. The girl may have been lost when the long-boat was swamped, or may have been captured by aborigines as there were rumours later of a white woman having been seen with aborigines in the area.

Captain Phillip Parker King of HMS Mermaid found the wreck of Frederick on 13 July 1819 while he was on a surveying expedition.
