= SS Fred Herrling =

Liberty ship of WWII

History

United States
- Name: Fred Herrling
- Namesake: Fred Herrling
- Owner: War Shipping Administration (WSA)
- Operator: R.A. Nichol & Company
- Ordered: as type (EC2-S-C1) hull, MC hull 2517
- Awarded: 23 April 1943
- Builder: St. Johns River Shipbuilding Company, Jacksonville, Florida
- Cost: $1,174,299
- Yard number: 81
- Way number: 4
- Laid down: 23 December 1944
- Launched: 30 January 1945
- Sponsored by: Mrs. Kenneth Jones
- Completed: 10 February 1945
- Identification: Call sign: ANIN
- Fate: Laid up in the National Defense Reserve Fleet, Wilmington, North Carolina, 17 August 1948; Sold for scrapping, 4 April 1968, withdrawn from fleet, 14 May 1968

General characteristics
- Class & type: Liberty ship; type EC2-S-C1, standard
- Tonnage: 10,865 LT DWT; 7,176 GRT
- Displacement: 3,380 long tons (3,434 t) (light); 14,245 long tons (14,474 t) (max)
- Length: 441 feet 6 inches (135 m) oa; 416 feet (127 m) pp; 427 feet (130 m) lwl
- Beam: 57 feet (17 m)
- Draft: 27 ft 9.25 in (8.4646 m)
- Installed power: 2 × Oil fired 450 °F (232 °C) boilers, operating at 220 psi (1,500 kPa); 2,500 hp (1,900 kW)
- Propulsion: 1 × triple-expansion steam engine, (manufactured by General Machinery Corp., Hamilton, Ohio); 1 × screw propeller
- Speed: 11.5 knots (21.3 km/h; 13.2 mph)
- Capacity: 562,608 cubic feet (15,931 m^{3}) (grain); 499,573 cubic feet (14,146 m^{3}) (bale)
- Complement: 38–62 USMM; 21–40 USNAG
- Armament: Varied by ship; Bow-mounted 3-inch (76 mm)/50-caliber gun; Stern-mounted 4-inch (102 mm)/50-caliber gun; 2–8 × single 20-millimeter (0.79 in) Oerlikon anti-aircraft (AA) cannons and/or, 2–8 × 37-millimeter (1.46 in) M1 AA guns

SS Fred Herrling was a Liberty ship built in the United States during World War II. She was named after Fred Herrling, a Merchant seaman killed on the cargo ship SS Alaskan, 28 November 1942, when she was struck and sunk by a torpedo from German submarine U-172.

== Construction ==
Fred Herrling was laid down on 23 December 1944, under a Maritime Commission (MARCOM) contract, MC hull 2517, by the St. Johns River Shipbuilding Company, Jacksonville, Florida; she was sponsored by Mrs. Kenneth Jones, the niece of the namesake, and she was launched on 30 January 1945.

== History ==
She was allocated to the R.A. Nichol & Company, on 10 February 1945. On 17 August 1948, she was laid up in the National Defense Reserve Fleet, Wilmington, North Carolina. She was sold for scrapping, 4 April 1968, to Union Minerals & Alloys Corp. She was removed from the fleet, 14 May 1968.

== Bibliography ==
- "St. John's River Shipbuilding, Jacksonville FL". www.ShipbuildingHistory.com. 16 October 2010.
- Maritime Administration. "Fred Herrling". Ship History Database Vessel Status Card. U.S. Department of Transportation, Maritime Administration.
- Davies, James (May 2004). "Specifications (As-Built)" (PDF). p. 23.
- "SS Fred Herrling".
- "SS Alaskan". www.Uboat.net.
