= SS Francis Preston Blair =

World War II Liberty ship of the United States

Coordinates: 21.8°S 153.7°E

History
- Name: Francis Preston Blair
- Owner: War Shipping Administration.
- Operator: Sudden & Christenson Company
- Launched: 3 January 1943
- Fate: Wrecked 15 July 1945

General characteristics
- Class & type: Liberty ship; type EC2-S-C1, standard
- Tonnage: 10,865 LT DWT; 7,176 GRT
- Displacement: 3,380 long tons (3,434 t) (light); 14,245 long tons (14,474 t) (max)
- Length: 441 feet 6 inches (135 m) oa; 416 feet (127 m) pp; 427 feet (130 m) lwl
- Beam: 57 feet (17 m)
- Draft: 27 ft 9.25 in (8.4646 m)
- Installed power: 2 × Oil fired 450 °F (232 °C) boilers, operating at 220 psi (1,500 kPa); 2,500 hp (1,900 kW)
- Propulsion: 1 × triple-expansion steam engine, (manufactured by General Machinery Corp., Hamilton, Ohio); 1 × screw propeller
- Speed: 11.5 knots (21.3 km/h; 13.2 mph)
- Capacity: 562,608 cubic feet (15,931 m^{3}) (grain); 499,573 cubic feet (14,146 m^{3}) (bale)
- Complement: 38–62 USMM; 21–40 USNAG
- Armament: Varied by ship; Bow-mounted 3-inch (76 mm)/50-caliber gun; Stern-mounted 4-inch (102 mm)/50-caliber gun; 2–8 × single 20-millimeter (0.79 in) Oerlikon anti-aircraft (AA) cannons and/or, 2–8 × 37-millimeter (1.46 in) M1 AA guns

SS Francis Preston Blair was an American Liberty ship, 7,196 tons stranded on Saumarez Reef in the Coral Sea during a cyclone in 1945. The ship has since deteriorated into a rusty heap. The wreck was used by Royal Australian Air Force F-111 aircraft for target practice during the 1980s.

The bronze propeller was salvaged by unknown persons between 1964 and 1970. Wreck was visited by Wild Kingdom who made a TV episode hosted by Marlin Perkins for USA and world distribution in 1971.

Francis Preston Blair was operated during World War II by Sudden & Christenson Company under charter ships from the Maritime Commission and War Shipping Administration. She was unloading troops and supplies at off Queensland, Australia before the grounding.

== See also ==
- World War II United States Merchant Navy

== Sources ==
- Davies, James (May 2004). ""Liberty" Cargo Ship – Feature Article" (PDF). ww2ships.com.
