= SS Fred C. Stebbins =

Liberty ship of WWII

History

United States
- Name: Fred C. Stebbins
- Namesake: Fred C. Stebbins
- Owner: War Shipping Administration (WSA)
- Operator: Union Sulphur & Oil Co., Inc.
- Ordered: as type (EC2-S-C1) hull, MC hull 2513
- Awarded: 23 April 1943
- Builder: St. Johns River Shipbuilding Company, Jacksonville, Florida
- Cost: $981,676
- Yard number: 77
- Way number: 5
- Laid down: 24 November 1944
- Launched: 30 December 1944
- Sponsored by: Mrs. Fred C. Stebbins
- Completed: 11 January 1945
- Identification: Call sign: ANFE
- Fate: Laid up in the, James River Reserve Fleet, Lee Hall, Virginia, 16 December 1947; Transferred to US Navy, 3 February 1960, for armament testing

General characteristics
- Class & type: Liberty ship; type EC2-S-C1, standard
- Tonnage: 10,865 LT DWT; 7,176 GRT
- Displacement: 3,380 long tons (3,434 t) (light); 14,245 long tons (14,474 t) (max)
- Length: 441 feet 6 inches (135 m) oa; 416 feet (127 m) pp; 427 feet (130 m) lwl
- Beam: 57 feet (17 m)
- Draft: 27 ft 9.25 in (8.4646 m)
- Installed power: 2 × Oil fired 450 °F (232 °C) boilers, operating at 220 psi (1,500 kPa); 2,500 hp (1,900 kW)
- Propulsion: 1 × triple-expansion steam engine, (manufactured by General Machinery Corp., Hamilton, Ohio); 1 × screw propeller
- Speed: 11.5 knots (21.3 km/h; 13.2 mph)
- Capacity: 562,608 cubic feet (15,931 m^{3}) (grain); 499,573 cubic feet (14,146 m^{3}) (bale)
- Complement: 38–62 USMM; 21–40 USNAG
- Armament: Varied by ship; Bow-mounted 3-inch (76 mm)/50-caliber gun; Stern-mounted 4-inch (102 mm)/50-caliber gun; 2–8 × single 20-millimeter (0.79 in) Oerlikon anti-aircraft (AA) cannons and/or, 2–8 × 37-millimeter (1.46 in) M1 AA guns

SS Fred C. Stebbins was a Liberty ship built in the United States during World War II. She was named after Fred C. Stebbins, a Merchant seaman killed on the Liberty ship SS Johnathan Sturges, 24 February 1943, when she was struck and sunk by a torpedo from German submarine U-707.

== Construction ==
Fred C. Stebbins was laid down on 24 November 1944, under a Maritime Commission (MARCOM) contract, MC hull 2513, by the St. Johns River Shipbuilding Company, Jacksonville, Florida; she was sponsored by Mrs. Fred C. Stebbins, the mother of the namesake, and was launched on 30 December 1944.

== History ==
She was allocated to the Union Sulphur Company, on 11 January 1945. On 16 December 1947, she was laid up in the James River Reserve Fleet, Lee Hall, Virginia. On 21 July 1953, she was withdrawn from the fleet to be loaded with grain under the "Grain Program 1953", she returned loaded on 6 August 1953. On 31 October 1955, she was withdrawn to be unload, she returned reloaded with grain on 7 November 1955. On 26 March 1956, she was withdrawn from the fleet to be unloaded, she returned empty on 20 April 1956. She was transferred to the US Navy, 5 February 1960, for armament testing.

== Bibliography ==
- "St. John's River Shipbuilding, Jacksonville FL". www.ShipbuildingHistory.com. 16 October 2010.
- Maritime Administration. "Fred C. Stebbins". Ship History Database Vessel Status Card. U.S. Department of Transportation, Maritime Administration.
- Davies, James (May 2004). "Specifications (As-Built)" (PDF). p. 23.
- "SS Fred C. Stebbins".
- "SS Jonathan Sturges". www.Uboat.net.
