= SS F. Southall Farrar =

World War II Liberty ship of the United States

History

United States
- Name: F. Southall Farrar
- Namesake: F. Southall Farrar
- Ordered: as type (EC2-S-C1) hull, MC hull 2365
- Builder: J.A. Jones Construction, Brunswick, Georgia
- Cost: $989,957
- Yard number: 150
- Way number: 4
- Laid down: 22 May 1944
- Launched: 4 July 1944
- Sponsored by: Mrs. James A. Jones Jr.
- Completed: 20 July 1944
- Identification: Call Signal: WQAG
- Fate: Laid up in National Defense Reserve Fleet, Beaumont, Texas, 28 June 1948; Sold for scrapping, 30 December 1965

General characteristics
- Class & type: Liberty ship; type EC2-S-C1, standard
- Tonnage: 10,865 LT DWT; 7,176 GRT
- Displacement: 3,380 long tons (3,434 t) (light); 14,245 long tons (14,474 t) (max)
- Length: 441 feet 6 inches (135 m) oa; 416 feet (127 m) pp; 427 feet (130 m) lwl
- Beam: 57 feet (17 m)
- Draft: 27 ft 9.25 in (8.4646 m)
- Installed power: 2 × Oil fired 450 °F (232 °C) boilers, operating at 220 psi (1,500 kPa); 2,500 hp (1,900 kW)
- Propulsion: 1 × triple-expansion steam engine, (manufactured by General Machinery Corp., Hamilton, Ohio); 1 × screw propeller
- Speed: 11.5 knots (21.3 km/h; 13.2 mph)
- Capacity: 562,608 cubic feet (15,931 m^{3}) (grain); 499,573 cubic feet (14,146 m^{3}) (bale)
- Complement: 38–62 USMM; 21–40 USNAG
- Armament: Varied by ship; Bow-mounted 3-inch (76 mm)/50-caliber gun; Stern-mounted 4-inch (102 mm)/50-caliber gun; 2–8 × single 20-millimeter (0.79 in) Oerlikon anti-aircraft (AA) cannons and/or, 2–8 × 37-millimeter (1.46 in) M1 AA guns

SS F. Southall Farrar was a Liberty ship built in the United States during World War II. She was named after F. Southall Farrar, an agriculturist and 4-H leader from Virginia.

== Construction ==
F. Southall Farrar was laid down on 22 May 1944, under a United States Maritime Commission (MARCOM) contract, MC hull 2365, by J.A. Jones Construction, Brunswick, Georgia; she was sponsored by Mrs. James A. Jones Jr., daughter-in-law of James Addison Jones, and launched on 4 July 1944.

== History ==
She was allocated to the Union Sulphur Company, on 20 July 1944. On 28 June 1948, she was laid up in the National Defense Reserve Fleet in Beaumont, Texas. On 30 December 1965, she was sold, to Sampson Iron & Supply Co., for $51,505, to be scrapped. She was removed from the fleet on 17 January 1966.

== Bibliography ==
- "Jones Construction, Brunswick GA". ShipbuildingHistory.com. 13 October 2010.
- "Liberty Ships – World War II".
- Maritime Administration. "F. Southall Farrar". Ship History Database Vessel Status Card. U.S. Department of Transportation, Maritime Administration. Archived from the original on 12 December 2019.
- Davies, James (May 2004). "Specifications (As-Built)" (PDF). p. 23.
- "SS F. Southall Farrar".
