= SS Francisco Morazan (1944) =

Liberty ship of WWII

- SS Haralampos Hadjipateras at Vancouver in 1953.

History

United States
- Name: Francisco Morazan
- Namesake: Francisco Morazán
- Operator: War Shipping Administration
- Builder: Permanente Metals Corporation
- Yard number: 2734
- Way number: 2
- Laid down: 30 December 1943
- Launched: 18 January 1944
- Completed: 25 January 1944
- Fate: Sold to a commercial owner, 1947

Greece
- Name: 1947–52 Chryssi; 1952–63 Haralampos Hadjipateras; 1963–67 Aegaion
- Operator: 1947–52 Petros J. Goulandris' Sons; 1952–59 Adamantios C. Hadjipateras; 1959–67 Sapphire Compania Naviera S.A.
- Home port: 1947–52 Andros; 1952–67 Piraeus
- Fate: Broken up, 1967

General characteristics
- Class & type: Liberty ship; type EC2-S-C1, standard
- Tonnage: 10,865 LT DWT; 7,176 GRT
- Displacement: 3,380 long tons (3,434 t) (light); 14,245 long tons (14,474 t) (max)
- Length: 441 feet 6 inches (135 m) oa; 416 feet (127 m) pp; 427 feet (130 m) lwl
- Beam: 57 feet (17 m)
- Draft: 27 ft 9.25 in (8.4646 m)
- Installed power: 2 × Oil fired 450 °F (232 °C) boilers, operating at 220 psi (1,500 kPa); 2,500 hp (1,900 kW)
- Propulsion: 1 × triple-expansion steam engine, (manufactured by General Machinery Corp., Hamilton, Ohio); 1 × screw propeller
- Speed: 11.5 knots (21.3 km/h; 13.2 mph)
- Capacity: 562,608 cubic feet (15,931 m^{3}) (grain); 499,573 cubic feet (14,146 m^{3}) (bale)
- Complement: 38–62 USMM; 21–40 USNAG
- Armament: Varied by ship; Bow-mounted 3-inch (76 mm)/50-caliber gun; Stern-mounted 4-inch (102 mm)/50-caliber gun; 2–8 × single 20-millimeter (0.79 in) Oerlikon anti-aircraft (AA) cannons and/or, 2–8 × 37-millimeter (1.46 in) M1 AA guns

SS Francisco Morazan was a Liberty ship built in the United States during World War II. The ship saw service with the War Shipping Administration during the Philippines campaign in 1944, and was sold to a Greek owner in 1947. Under its Greek owners, the ship was renamed Chryssi in 1947, Haralampos Hadjipateras in 1952, and Aegaion in 1963. In 1967, the ship was scrapped, meeting the same fate as most other Liberty ships.

== Construction ==
Francisco Morazan was laid down on 30 December 1943 as Yard Number 2734 by the Permanente Metals Corporation, on Way Number 2 in their Kaiser Richmond No. 2 Yard in Richmond, California. The ship was launched on 18 January 1944 and was completed on 25 January 1944, being completed in 26 days. The ship was named after Francisco Morazán, a Central American politician who served as the president of the Federal Republic of Central America between 1830 and 1834 and again from 1835 to 1839.

== Military service ==
The ship participated in the Philippines campaign in 1944, being credited with destroying a Japanese aircraft on 24 November 1944. While under heavy fire from Japanese aircraft on 27 December 1944, the ship landed 10,000 tons of ammunition at Mindoro, while firing eleven tons of ammunition at Japanese aircraft, shooting down several aircraft in the process. Captain John J. Brady, the officers, and the crew of Francisco Morazan were commended by Brigadier General William C. Dunckel for "maintaining full efficiency and a well disciplined ship's and gun crew despite a perilous cargo". Francisco Morazan was the only ship of the caravan of three Liberty ships, the others being the SS John Burke and the SS William Sharon, to make the 72-hour voyage from Leyte to Mindoro without being sunk or damaged.

== Commercial service ==
Under a disposal scheme negotiated with the United States in 1946, the Greek government guaranteed the purchase of 100 surplus Liberty ships for operation under the Greek flag. Francisco Morazan was sold on 4 February 1947 to Petros J. Goulandris' Sons of Andros, where the ship was registered and renamed Chryssi. Five years later, the ship was sold to Adamantios C. Hadjipateras of Oinousses, given the name Haralampos Hadjipateras, and registered at Piraeus.

In 1959, Hadjipateras transferred ownership to a Panamanian company, Sapphire Compania Naviera S.A., though the ship continued sailing under the Greek flag, being renamed Aegaion in 1963. Towards the end of the Vietnam War, Aegaion was included in a list of "free world vessels" which had traded with North Vietnam in 1964 in a document presented to the United States House of Representatives.

The ship was scrapped at Shanghai in April 1967.
