= Saumarez Reefs =

Group of coral reefs off the northeast coast of Australia

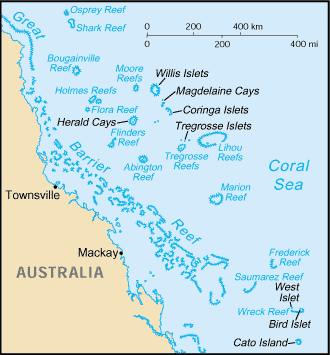
Map of the Coral Sea Islands

Saumarez Reefs is one of the southernmost reef systems located in the Coral Sea Islands, and part of the Coral Sea Shelf; it contains three main reefs and numerous smaller reefs all of which form a large crescent-shaped formation open to the northwest, approximately 27 by 14 kilometres (17 mi × 9 mi), with an area of just under 300 km^{2} (120 sq mi).

There are two sand cays: North East Cay and South West Cay.

The reefs were first reported by Europeans on 27 February 1823 by Lieutenant John Lihou aboard the vessel Zenobia and named after Vice-Admiral of the United Kingdom James Saumarez, 1st Baron de Saumarez.

== General ==
Saumarez Reefs Lighthouse
- Location: Saumarez Reefs, Coral Sea Islands, Australia
- Coordinates: 21°38′13″S 153°45′33″E

Tower
- Foundation: concrete base
- Construction: metal skeletal tower
- Height: 19 m (62 ft)
- Shape: two-stage tower, square frustum lower part, square prism upper part with balcony and light
- Markings: white tower
- Power source: solar power
- Operator: Australian Maritime Safety Authority

Light
- Focal height: 21 m (69 ft)
- Range: 10 nmi (19 km; 12 mi)
- Characteristic: Fl(4) W 20s

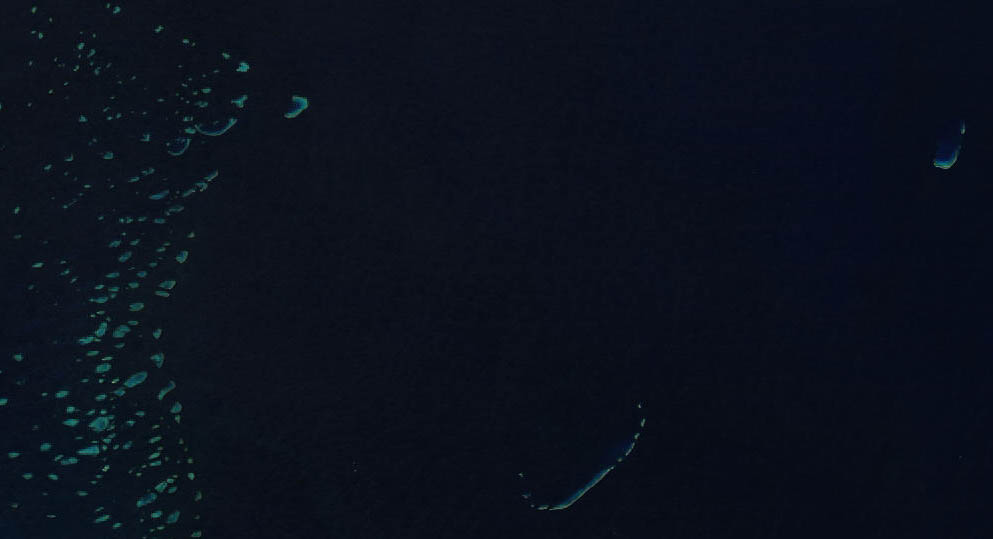
Satellite View of Saumarez Reefs (center) and the Swains reef (Left part of the Great Barrier Reef) and Frederick Reefs (right)

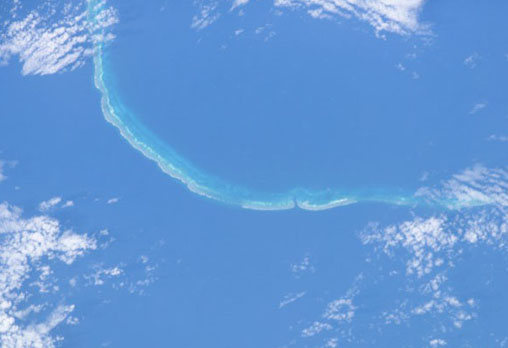
Satellite view of Saumarez Reefs

The Saumarez Reefs are on the Coral Sea shelf, 330 km (210 mi) northeast of Gladstone, Queensland, 85 km (53 mi) to the east of the Great Barrier Reef's Swain Reefs and 95 km (59 mi) to the southwest of the Frederick Reefs.

The Saumarez Reefs consist of three main reefs and many smaller reefs that form a large crescent-shaped formation, measuring 39 km (24 mi) across, that is open to the northwest. There are two sand cays: North East Cay and South West Cay.

North East Cay (21°38′S 153°46′E) is the northernmost of the Saumarez Reefs. It is a small sand cay lying near the northern extremity of Saumarez Reefs. This 2.4 m (7 ft 10 in) high cay, which is enclosed by a coral reef, has an opening on the southwestern side. There is a lighthouse on the cay. A clear channel, about 2.1 km (1.3 mi) wide, lies between North East Cay and the next reef to the south.

South East Elbow (21°55′S 153°35′E) is about 36 km (22 mi) south-southwest of Northeast Cay. It forms the southeastern extremity of Saumarez Reefs. SS Francis Preston Blair, an American Liberty ship, is a conspicuous stranded wreck and lies about 9.4 km (5.8 mi) northeast of South East Elbow. The Royal Australian Air Force F-111 aircraft used the wreck for target practice during the 1980s.

Three small reefs lie between 0.9 and 7.6 km (0.6 and 4.7 mi) west-northwest of Southeast Elbow. These small reefs are separated from each other by unsurveyed channels with widths from 0.9 to 2.2 km (0.6 to 1.4 mi).

South West Cay (21°50′S 153°30′E), enclosed by a reef, lies 10.8 km (6.7 mi) northwest of Southeast Elbow. It is the westernmost above-water part of the Saumarez Reefs, and is 2.4 m (7 ft 10 in) high. There is a 4 km (2.5 mi)-wide channel between the cay and the reef to the south-southeast.

== History ==
On 27 February 1823, Captain John Lihou, master of the 550-ton Zenobia of Calcutta, saw the reef system and named it Sir James Saumarez' Shoal (now Saumarez Reefs) after Saumarez. Lihou recorded the find as "it is in latitude 21 degrees 40 minutes, and longitude 153 degrees 46 minutes by chronometer, which was found correct on making Sandy Cape a day or two afterwards. There is reason to suppose that many other reefs exist to the North-West of this position."

Lihou had just previously discovered Lihou Reef and Cays on 23 February 1823. Zenobia, was on passage from Manila to South America and Lihou had chosen a route through Torres Strait. This was the first occasion a ship was navigated through Torres Strait from west to east. It was also the first occasion a ship was navigated through the Coral Sea from Torres Strait, south-eastward to the southward of New Caledonia.

The Zenobia entered Endeavour Strait in January 1823 and discovered a shallow port on the south coast of Prince of Wales Island, named Port Yarborough by Lihou and subsequently named Port Lihou. After a hazardous passage through the Strait, losing four anchors and a rudder, the ship departed the Great Barrier Reef via an opening near Murray Islands. On 23 February, Lihou Reefs were sighted and on the 27th of that month, other reefs were discovered and these Lihou named Sir James Saumarez Shoals (now Reef).

There is some thought that Saumarez Reefs could in fact be Midway Reef which had been sighted prior to the sailing of the Zenobia and described in an extract of a letter from Captain Carns, or the ship Neptune, to the Secretary of the Marine Board, describing the reef discovered between New Holland and New Guinea.

Thinking it a duty I owe for the benefit of Navigators, I beg leave to acquaint you of the discovery I made between New Holland and New Guinea. On the 20th day of June last (1818), I took a good departure from Sandy Cape, New Holland, and steered a course to keep in mid-way, between the Great Barrier and Wreck Reefs On the following day at noon, saw sandbanks and small rocks- a-head, stretching as far to the Eastward as we could see from the masthead, and about five miles to the Westward, I immediately wore and run down to the Western extremity, and passed it within two miles longitude, by good timekeepers, 154° 20’ East, and latitude 21° 58’ South, and as the Western End of Wreck Reef is laid down in 155° 28’ East, I concluded it mull be a new discovery and called it Midway Reef; as it renders the navigation between the Great Barrier and Wreck Reefs very critical, I submit it to your consideration to give it such publicity as you may deem necessary I have, etc. R. CARNS

This is approximately the same latitude as Saumarez South East Elbow with a difference in the longitude of approximately 70 km (which for the time was still reasonably close to the mark) and seen almost five years prior to sighting by the Zenobia.

== Known shipwrecks on the reefs ==
=== Noumea May 1880 ===
13 May 1880 the "blackbirder" labour schooner Noumea, on her return trip from Santa Island to Mackay, with ninety nine Islanders, including eight women, struck on Saumarez reef, on 13 May, and became a total wreck. Seven of the Islanders were drowned in swimming off from the wreck to the boats, but the remainder, together with the crew, were rescued by the steamer Leichhardt, sent to their assistance by the owner of the vessel

The schooner Noumea was a vessel of some 144 tons approximately 100foot and built at George's River New South Wales in 1873 by Geo and Registered (64437) and owned by Mr Paxton, of Mackay, and was about six years old Her captain (RJ Belbin) was formerly in command of the Lady Darling, and has bad an extensive experience in the South Sea Island labour trade the vessel had, we behave, been recently purchased by Mr. Paxton for £2600, and was on her first trading voyage between the South Sea Islands and Mackay She was insured in the Sydney office of the Australian Alliance Company

Captain South, of the Keilawarra, from Brisbane, reported when he arrived at Sea Hill on the morning of 18 May of having picked up a boat containing Captain Belbin and six white sailors in great distress of the schooner Nouméa, which vessel had been wrecked on 13 May on Saumarez Reef,

Captain South's report added that there were four white men (including the Government agent) and ninety-nine islanders still at the wreck and the reef, in need of immediate assistance, as they have no food to sustain them

The captain left the vessel the day after she struck, and that, and as up to that time the crew had been unable to save any provisions from the wreck, it is feared the people left behind

Mr WH Paxton, the owner of the Nouméa, arranged with the ASN Company for the Steamer Leichhardt, to proceed to the wreck, and with instructions to bring the islanders from the wreck to Keppel Bay, where they are to be transshipped into the Tinonee for Mackay, which is their destination

The steamer Leichhardt had arrived at Keppel Bay on 21 May 1880 from the scene of the wreck of the schooner Noumea with the whole of the European crew of the vessel and ninety-three South Sea Islanders. Other islanders were drowned while endeavouring to swim from the wreck to the boats the day after the vessel struck.

Several of the rescued islanders are very weak, but there was no sickness amongst them. The islanders proceed to Mackay in the Tinonee.

The Nouméa was bilged and dismasted, and a total wreck on the north-east point of Saumarez Reef.

The following narrative of one of the shipwrecked crew is Arthur William Munson, one of the crew of the captain's boat, gives us the. following short account of the wreck:

"We sailed about thirteen or fourteen days ago from the island of Santo, in the New Hebrides, bound for Mackay, with ninety-two South Sea Islanders on board as passengers.

Everything went well till Thursday evening. I had finished my trick at the wheel about two hours before the accident; the course then was south-west half-west. At about half-past 7 in the evening the ship struck the reef, not heavily but grazing; after that she struck heavier and then bounced right on to the reef high up.

The captain at once got the starboard boat on deck, got her ready, and waited for daybreak. She was then launched over the starboard quarter with a crew consisting of the boatswain, four Kanakas, two black women, and a boy. The boat got through a break in the reef and lay under the lee of the reef on the other side. Then twenty-seven of the islanders took the water and swam through the reef to the boat; but the boatswain could not take them all in, and I saw seven of them in the water when the boat left for the island or sandspit at the end of the reef. I am sure that of these at least five were drowned.

In the meantime the port boat was launched over the starboard side. I was one of the crew. We took nine more islanders, including one woman, but could not succeed in landing her. I was swimming in the water nearly half-an-hour trying to land the woman, and at last they got her into the other boat. Only thirty-three islanders got out of the wreck, and when we came away in the captain's boat the rest of them were left on board.

They had nothing to eat but bread damaged with salt water, and I don't know how they can have survived. The ship could not hold together long if it came on to blow. This is the second time within five months that I have been wrecked in these seas,"

=== SS Francis Preston Blair July 1945 ===
SS Francis Preston Blair. American Liberty ship, 7196 tons. Built 1943 by the Marinship Corporation Yard at Sausalito, on the north west side of San Francisco Bay, which built a total of fifteen Liberty ships. Lbd 422.8 x 57 x 34.8 ft. Wrecked on the eastern edge of the Saumarez Reef in the Coral Sea, 15 July 1945. She was used on occasions as a target by the RAAF, which dropped practice and live bombs. Stranding occurred during a cyclone. An explosion hole in the starboard bow at the waterline has never been explained. VIDEO 1964

== See also ==
- List of lighthouses in the Coral Sea Islands
