= SS Frederick E. Williamson =

Liberty ship of WWII

History

United States
- Name: Frederick E. Williamson
- Namesake: Frederick E. Williamson
- Owner: War Shipping Administration (WSA)
- Operator: International Freighting Corp.
- Ordered: as type (EC2-S-C5) hull, MC hull 2334
- Builder: J.A. Jones Construction, Panama City, Florida
- Cost: $1,248,119
- Yard number: 75
- Way number: 5
- Laid down: 18 November 1944
- Launched: 23 December 1944
- Sponsored by: Mrs. Ruby Harris
- Completed: 12 January 1945
- Identification: Call sign: ANEC
- Fate: Placed in the National Defense Reserve Fleet, Hudson River Reserve Fleet, Jones Point, New York, 5 June 1946; Returned to, Hudson River Reserve Fleet, Jones Point, 28 February 1947; Transferred to the, James River Reserve Fleet, Lee Hall, Virginia, 6 October 1947; Returned to the, James River Reserve Fleet, Lee Hall, 20 October 1951; Placed in the, National Defense Reserve Fleet, Olympia, Washington, 2 October 1953; Transferred to US Navy, 8 April 1970; Scuttled, May 1970

General characteristics
- Class & type: Liberty ship; type EC2-S-C5, boxed aircraft transport
- Tonnage: 10,600 LT DWT; 7,200 GRT
- Displacement: 3,380 long tons (3,434 t) (light); 14,245 long tons (14,474 t) (max)
- Length: 441 feet 6 inches (135 m) oa; 416 feet (127 m) pp; 427 feet (130 m) lwl
- Beam: 57 feet (17 m)
- Draft: 27 ft 9.25 in (8.4646 m)
- Installed power: 2 × Oil fired 450 °F (232 °C) boilers, operating at 220 psi (1,500 kPa); 2,500 hp (1,900 kW)
- Propulsion: 1 × triple-expansion steam engine, (manufactured by Filer and Stowell, Milwaukee, Wisconsin); 1 × screw propeller
- Speed: 11.5 knots (21.3 km/h; 13.2 mph)
- Capacity: 490,000 cubic feet (13,875 m^{3}) (bale)
- Complement: 38–62 USMM; 21–40 USNAG
- Armament: Varied by ship; Bow-mounted 3-inch (76 mm)/50-caliber gun; Stern-mounted 4-inch (102 mm)/50-caliber gun; 2–8 × single 20-millimeter (0.79 in) Oerlikon anti-aircraft (AA) cannons and/or, 2–8 × 37-millimeter (1.46 in) M1 AA guns

SS Frederick E. Williamson was a Liberty ship built in the United States during World War II. She was named after Frederick E. Williamson.

== Construction ==
Frederick E. Williamson was laid down on 18 November 1944, under a Maritime Commission (MARCOM) contract, MC hull 2334, by J.A. Jones Construction, Panama City, Florida; sponsored by Mrs. Ruby Harris, the owner of the Cove Hotel, Panama City, she was launched on 23 December 1944.

== History ==
She was allocated to International Freighting Corp., on 12 January 1945. On 5 June 1946, she was laid up in the Hudson River Reserve Fleet, Jones Point, New York. On 29 January 1947, while being withdrawn from the fleet to be delivered to Moore-McCormack Lines, Inc., she was damaged. With estimates of repairs at $70,000 she was returned to the Hudson River Reserve Fleet. After repairs she was charted to Waterman Steamship Corp., 30 August 1947. She was laid up in the James River Reserve Fleet, Lee Hall, Virginia, 6 October 1947. On 20 October 1951, she was charted to American President Lines. She was laid up in the National Defense Reserve Fleet, Olympia, Washington, 2 October 1953. On 8 April 1970, she was transferred to the US Navy for use as an Ammo Disposal Ship. She was scuttled with obsolete ammunition 100 nmi (190 km; 120 mi) off the coast of Tatoosh Island, Washington.

== Bibliography ==
- "Jones Construction, Panama City FL". www.ShipbuildingHistory.com. 13 October 2010.
- Maritime Administration. "Frederick E. Williamson". Ship History Database Vessel Status Card. U.S. Department of Transportation, Maritime Administration.
- Davies, James (May 2004). "Specifications (As-Built)" (PDF). p. 23.
- "SS Frederick E. Williamson".
- "SS Frederick E. Williamson". www.Wrecksite.eu. 16 June 2010.
