= Loss payee clause =

Clause directing insurance claim payments to a third-party interest

A loss payee clause (or loss payable clause) is a clause in a contract of insurance that provides, in the event of payment being made under the policy in relation to the insured risk, that payment will be made to a third party rather than to the insured beneficiary of the policy.

Such clauses are common where the insured property is subject to a mortgage or other security interest and the mortgagee, usually a bank, requires the property be insured and that such a clause be included. The clauses are found in maritime insurance in relation to insuring mortgaged vessels. When selling land via a land contract, the seller may require the buyer to include a loss payee clause in their insurance policy to protect the seller's ongoing interest in the property until the contract is concluded.

As a matter of practicality, such clauses are usually appended to the end of existing policies in a separate addendum, after being negotiated between the insurer and the mortgagee. A sample clause issued by Lloyd's of London states that

This Loss Payee clause shall in no manner or wise be construed as a separate agreement between Underwriters and the Beneficiary but only as a simple appointment of the beneficiary by the Assured to receive payment as its interest may appear from any funds which Underwriters agree to pay to the Assured in the event of any loss or from any judgement granted to the Assured.

== Sample clause ==
It is noted that, by an assignment in writing collateral to a first priority statutory ship mortgage (the "Mortgage"), [the shipowner] (the "Owner") assigned absolutely to [the bank] (the "Assignee") the benefit of this policy of insurance and all benefits of this policy, including all claims of any nature (including return of premiums) under this policy. Claims payable under this policy in respect of a total or constructive total or an arranged or agreed or compromised total loss or unrepaired damage and all claims which (in the reasonable opinion of the Assignee) are analogous thereto shall be payable to the Assignee up to the Assignee's mortgage interest. Subject thereto, all other claims, unless and until underwriters have received notice from the Assignee of a default under the Mortgage, in which event all claims under this policy shall be payable directly to the Assignee up to the amount of the Assignee's mortgage interest, shall be payable as follows:
1. a claim in respect of any one casualty where the aggregate claim against all insurers does not exceed $500,000 or the equivalent in any other currency, prior to adjustment for any franchise or deductible under the terms of the policy, shall be paid directly to the Owner for the repair, salvage or other charges involved or as a reimbursement if the Owner has fully repaired the damage and paid all of the salvage or other charges;
2. a claim in respect of any one casualty where the aggregate claim against all insurers exceeds $500,000 or the equivalent in any other currency prior to adjustment for any franchise or deductible under the terms of the policy, shall, subject to the prior written consent of the Assignee, be paid to the Owner as and when [the vessel] (the "Vessel") is restored to her former state and condition and the liability in respect of which the insurance loss is payable is discharged, and provided that [the insurers] (the "Insurers") may with such consent make payment on account of repairs in the course of being effected, but, in the absence of any such prior written consent shall be payable directly to the Assignee up to the Assignee's mortgage interest. Notwithstanding the terms of this loss payable clause and notwithstanding notice of assignment, unless and until brokers receive notice from the Assignee to the contrary, brokers shall be empowered to arrange their proportion of any collision and/or salvage guarantee to be given in the event of bail being required in order to prevent the arrest of the Vessel or to secure the release of the Vessel from arrest following a casualty.
