= Queensland Guyot =

Submerged volcano off the east coast of Australia

- Location within Pacific Ocean
- Named seamounts in Tasmantid Seamount Chain with Queensland Guyot labelled in red (red pushpins – coral reefs, yellow pushpins – seamounts)
- Summit depth: 419 metres (1,375 ft)

Location
- Location: To the east of the coast off Brisbane, Queensland, Australia
- Group: Tasmantid Seamount Chain
- Coordinates: 27°35′00″S 155°11′01″E

Geology
- Type: Guyot

The Queensland Guyot is an extinct volcanic seamount of the Tasmantid Seamount Chain.

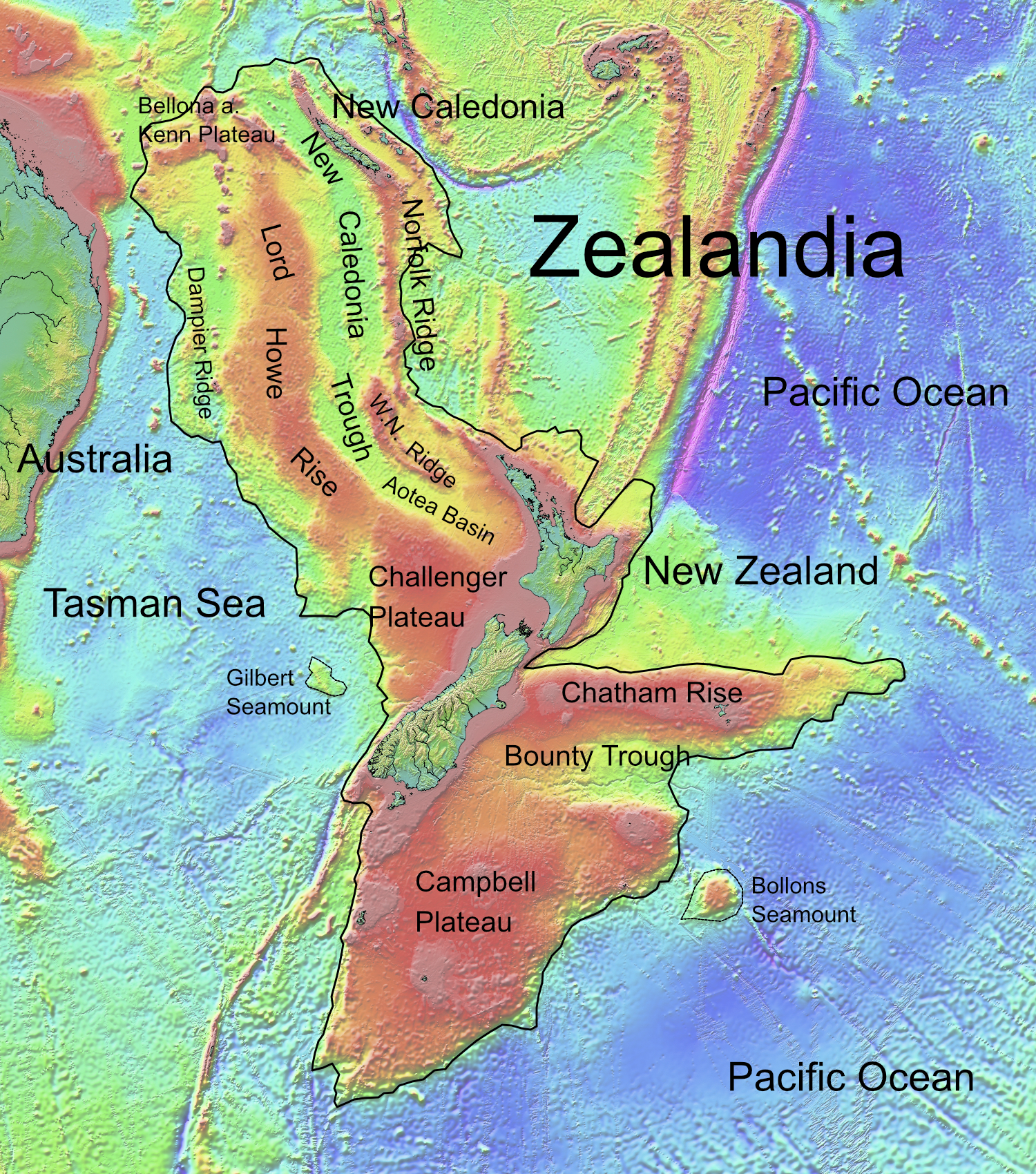
Topographic map of Zealandia that includes the Queensland Guyot at the sea bottom of the Tasman Sea in the line of the Tasmantid hotspot seamounts off the east coast of Australia.

It is a basaltic volcano that erupted about 20,900,000 years ago, with survey data that indicates it rises about 4,000 m (13,000 ft) above the local sea floor to a minimum depth of 419 m (1,375 ft). It is just to the north of the Britannia Guyots and is connected to them by a ridge that rises about 2,000 m (6,600 ft) from the sea floor. It was described as a seamount in 1961.

The waters above it are incorporated in the Central Eastern Marine Park, an Australian marine park.
