= Queensland Wood Reference Collection =

The Wood Reference Collection is a Queensland Government scientific collection based in Queensland, Australia. It is the oldest xylotheque (also known as a xylarium) of authenticated wood specimens in Australia and the third largest in the nation. It consists of 21 separate collections of wood block samples, including 17 international collections, and a glass slide collection of timber microstructure sections. Together, they provide a comprehensive reference collection of anatomical characteristics for Queensland timbers, and some national and international timbers.

The Wood Reference Collection supports activities integral to the:

- Biosecurity Act 2015
- Environment Protection and Biodiversity Conservation Act 1999
- Illegal Logging Prohibition Act 2012

== History and current use ==
The Wood Reference Collection was first established in the 1880's as a legacy of Australia sending wood samples to international exhibitions to promote their timber exports. The Wood Reference Collection is the only xylarium in Australia still in use for the identification of wood specimens. It is also the only public collection for the accurate identification of processed wood. The services of the collection are open for government and the public (on a fee-for-service basis), helping to ascertain the provenance of any processed wood piece, including furniture, cultural products or architecture, among others. In Queensland, the expertise connected to the collection is regularly used for insurance investigations, forensic examination and to assure compliance with trade and import laws.

The collection includes:

- almost 13,000 wood samples representing 200 plant genera
- more than 9,000 samples of Queensland tree species
- almost 5,000 microscope slides of stained timber microstructure sections from 108 plant families
- slides showing a transverse section, a radial longitudinal section and a tangential longitudinal section for each species.

== Importance of the collection ==
The Wood Reference Collection is a unique collection of mainly Queensland timbers assembled by government botanists collecting plant materials since the 1880s. Once a tree has been removed from its environment and the wood has been processed, it can often be hard to identify the provenance or age of a specific piece. The wood blocks and microscope samples held at the Wood Reference Collection are invaluable as the provenance of a specific piece can influence how its value is determined.

In art history, the wood used by specific artists or furniture makers (for antiques) is often very characteristic. The frame of a painting or the type of wood used to make a stool can give crucial information when investigating whether an object is genuine or a replica.

Similarly, anthropological studies on cultural objects or forensic studies on weapons often benefit from wood identification services. Specific cultures might have favoured specific wood types for ritual purposes, giving a clue as to the use of found objects. The Queensland Police Service Ballistic Unit have used the collection to identify the type and origin of wooden firearm stocks, and archaeologists working on structures such as a heritage listed timber bridge in Beaudesert, Queensland, the Wickham Terrace Tower Mill (The Old Windmill, Brisbane), the Cato (1800 ship) (wrecked on the Wreck Reefs) and many others have also benefited from wood identification services.
