= Taupo Bank =

Submerged volcano off the east coast of Australia

- Location within Pacific Ocean
- Named seamounts in Tasmantid Seamount Chain with Taupo Bank labelled in red (red pushpins – coral reefs, yellow pushpins – seamounts)
- Summit depth: 128 metres (420 ft)

Location
- Location: Just under 500 km (310 mi) to the east and slightly north of Sydney, New South Wales, Australia
- Group: Tasmantid Seamount Chain
- Coordinates: 33°10′0″S 156°10′0″E

Geology
- Type: Guyot

The Taupo Bank (also previously known as Mont Taupo,Taupo Guyot or Taupo Tablemount) is an extinct volcanic seamount of the Tasmantid Seamount Chain.

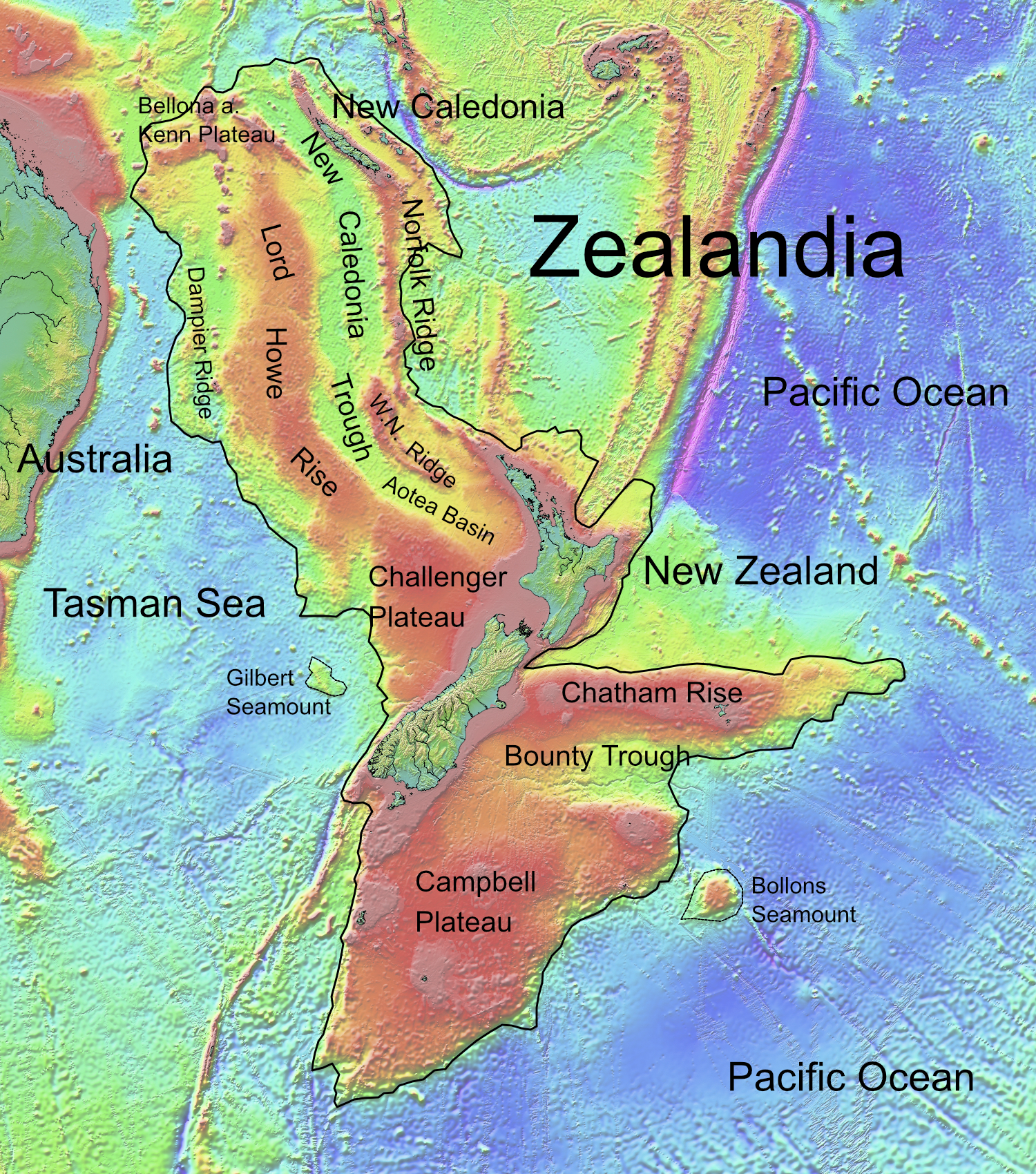
Topographic map of Zealandia that includes the Taupo Bank at the sea bottom of the Tasman Sea in the line of the Tasmantid hotspot seamounts off the east coast of Australia.

It is a basaltic volcano that erupted between 10,300,000 and 11,400,000 years ago, with survey data that indicates it rises about 3,160 m (10,370 ft) above the local sea floor to a minimum depth of 128 m (420 ft). The sediments deposited on top of the alkali olivine basalt originate from the Late Miocene. It was likely a coral-capped volcanic seamount during the Pleistocene low sea level. It was described as a seamount in 1961.

The Tasmantid Seamount Chain is parallel to the Lord Howe Seamount Chain. Because detailed compositional analysis elsewhere has suggested that as well as individual compositional maturation with time within an individual seamount chain there may be underlying shared mantle plume sources in such parallel chains this issue has been examined with samples from Taupo Bank. These samples share compositional analysis similarities with some of the volcanics that formed Lord Howe Island which would be consistent with a common or similar mantle plume source.

The waters above it are incorporated in the Central Eastern Marine Park, an Australian marine park.
