= Derwent Hunter Guyot =

Submerged volcano off the east coast of Australia

- Location within Pacific Ocean
- Named seamounts in Tasmantid Seamount Chain with Derwent Hunter Guyot labelled in red (red pushpins – coral reefs, yellow pushpins – seamounts)
- Summit depth: 323 metres (1,060 ft)

Location
- Location: To the east of the coast of New South Wales, Australia
- Group: Tasmantid Seamount Chain
- Coordinates: 30°51′57″S 156°11′21″E

Geology
- Type: Guyot

History
- Discovery date: Named from the Australian schooner "Derwent Hunter" that discovered it in 1958

The Derwent Hunter Guyot is an extinct volcanic seamount of the Tasmantid Seamount Chain.

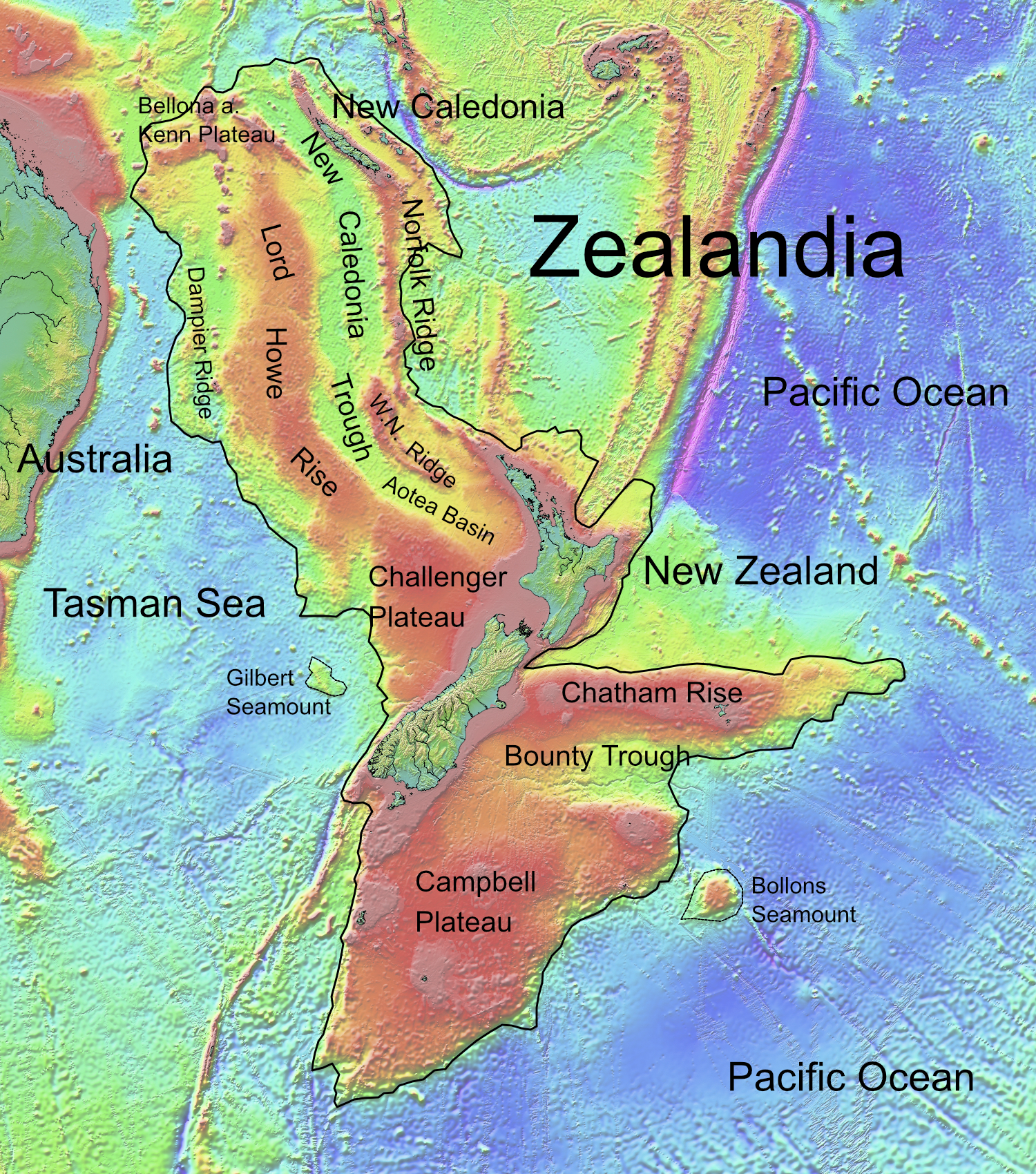
Topographic map of Zealandia that includes the Derwent Hunter Guyot at the sea bottom of the Tasman Sea in the line of the Tasmantid hotspot seamounts off the east coast of Australia.

It is a basaltic volcano that erupted between 12,400,000 and 15,400,000 years ago, with survey data that indicates it rises about 4,000 m (13,000 ft) above the local sea floor to a minimum depth of 323 m (1,060 ft). The sediments deposited on top of the alkali olivine basalt originate from the early Middle Miocene. The Derwent Hunter Guyot appears to be double peaked. It was discovered in 1958 and described as a seamount in 1961.

The waters above it are incorporated in the Central Eastern Marine Park, an Australian marine park.
