= Threespine grubfish =

Scientific classification
- Kingdom: Animalia
- Phylum: Chordata
- Class: Actinopterygii
- Order: Labriformes
- Family: Pinguipedidae
- Genus: Simipercis
- Species: S. trispinosa

Binomial name
- Simipercis trispinosa Johnson & Randall, 2006

Species of ray-finned fish

The threespine grubfish (Simipercis trispinosa) is the only species in the monotypic genus Simipercis, part of the family Pinguipedidae. The species is endemic to waters off eastern Australia from Swain Reefs, Queensland, to Broken Bay, New South Wales. It is distinguished from other sandperch by having three spines in the dorsal fin.
