= Britannia Guyots =

Submerged volcanos off the Gold Coast, Queensland, Australia

- Location within Pacific Ocean
- Named seamounts in Tasmantid Seamount Chain with Britannia Guyots labelled in red (red pushpins – coral reefs, yellow pushpins – seamounts)
- Summit depth: 421 metres (1,381 ft)

Location
- Location: To the east of the Gold Coast, Queensland, Australia
- Group: Tasmantid Seamount Chain
- Coordinates: 28°17′00″S 155°38′25″E

Geology
- Type: Guyot

History
- Discovery date: Named from the British cable ship "Britannia"

The Britannia Guyots (also known as Britannia Bank, Britannia Tablemount, Britannia Tablemounts, Brittania Guyots or Brittania Tablemounts) are a line of extinct volcanic seamounts in the Tasmantid Seamount Chain.

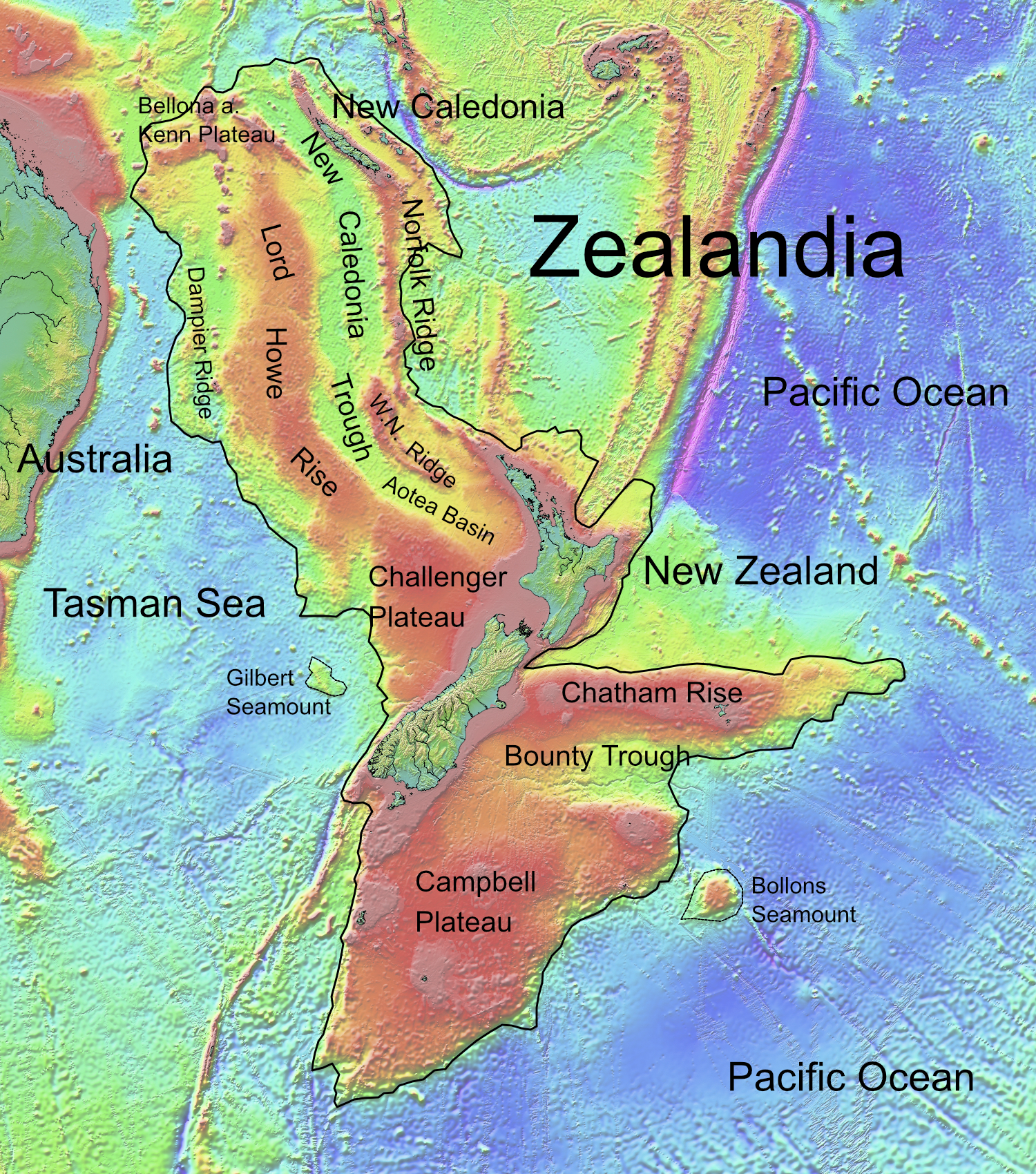
Topographic map of Zealandia that includes the Britannia Guyots at the sea bottom of the Tasman Sea in the line of the Tasmantid hotspot seamounts off the east coast of Australia.

They are basaltic volcanoes that erupted between 17,600,000 and 20,800,000 years ago, with survey data that indicates they rise about 4,000 m (13,000 ft) above the local sea floor to a minimum depth of 421 m (1,381 ft). The sediments deposited on top of the alkali olivine basalt originate from the early Middle Miocene when the ocean water was tropical to subtropical. They were described as seamounts in 1961.

The waters above it are incorporated in the Central Eastern Marine Park, an Australian marine park.
