= Fourth Fleet (Australia) =

Unofficial term for convict ships from Britain to Australia in 1792

The fourth Fleet is an unofficial term for the flow of convict ships from England to Australia in 1792. The term was coined by C.J. Smee, a historian, who has catalogued the genealogies of the First, Second and Third Fleet convicts and who used the term to group those ships that followed in the months immediately after the Third Fleet.

The ships connected to the "fleet" are:

- Pitt (arrived 14 February)
- Kitty (arrived 6 April)
- Royal Admiral (arrived 7 October)

== Gallery ==
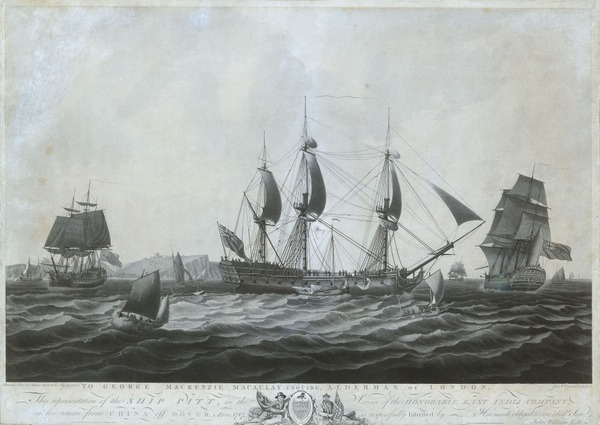
HMS Pitt

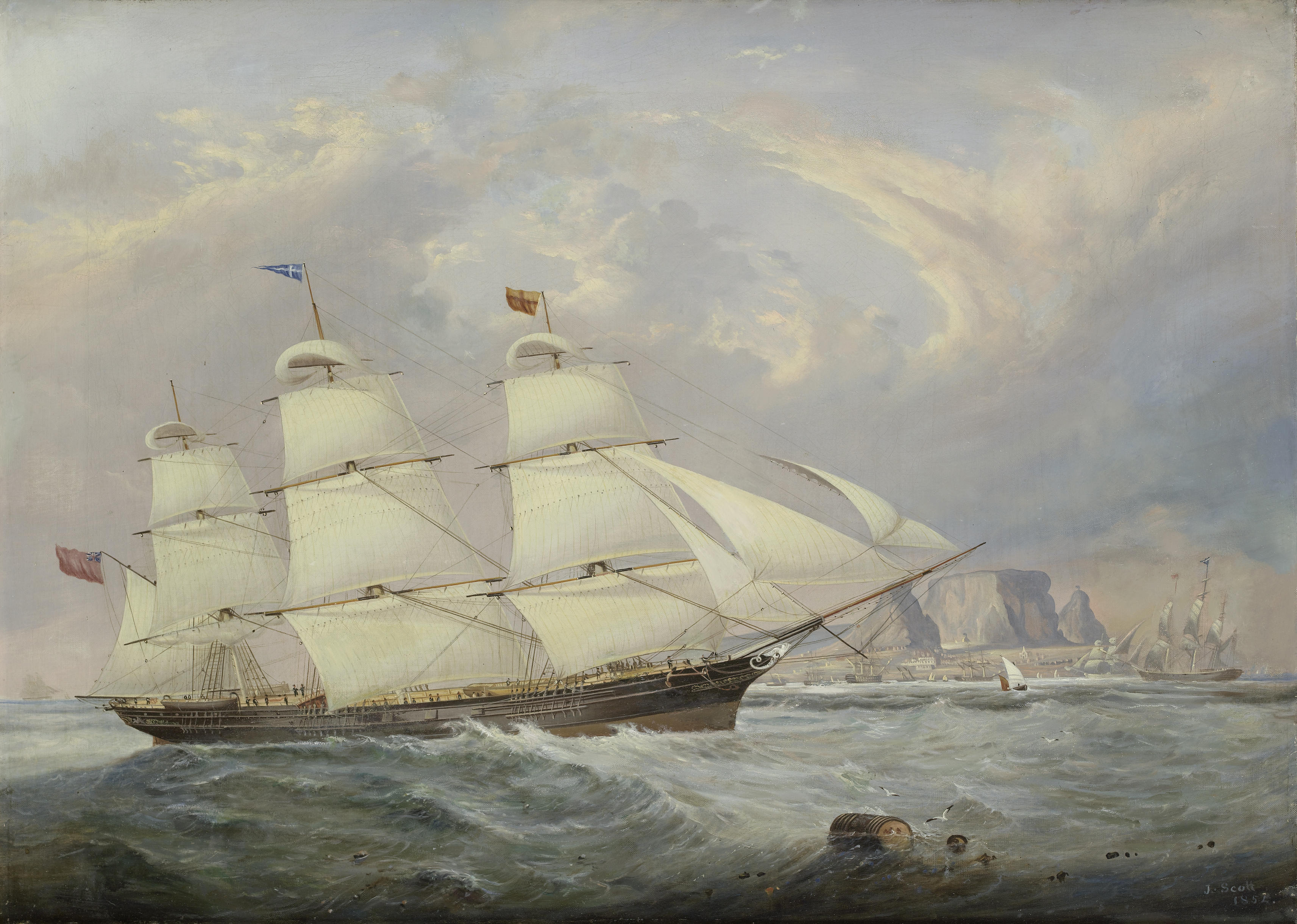
Merchantman of similar age to Kitty; Table Mountain is in the background

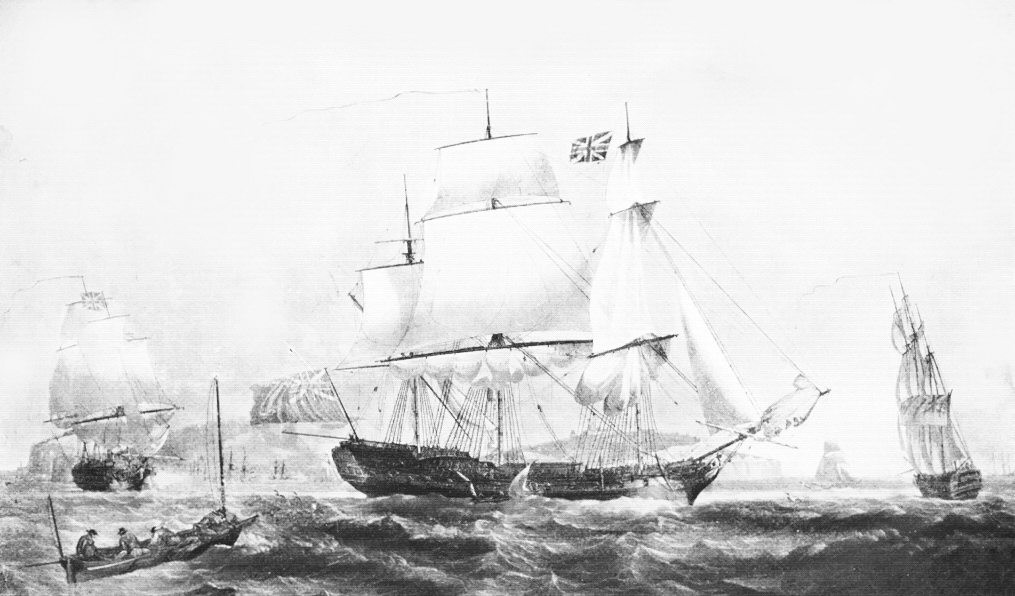
An EastIndiaman similar to Royal Admiral
