= Kitty (1787 ship) =

British merchant, slave, and convict transport ship

History

Great Britain
- Name: Kitty
- Owner: 1790: Captain & Co.; 1791: Christopher & Co.; 1800: Reeve & Co.
- Builder: Sunderland
- Launched: 1787
- Fate: Last listed 1805

General characteristics
- Tons burthen: 359, or 363 (bm)
- Armament: 6 × 3-pounder guns

Kitty was a merchantman built at Sunderland in 1787. In 1790 she carried slaves from the Gold Coast to Jamaica. Then in 1791 she transported convicts and goods from England to Australia. She was last listed in 1805.

== Career ==
=== Slave voyage (1789–1790) ===
In 1790 Kitty was under the command of Captain James Glynn. Captain Glynn sailed from London on 15 November 1789 and arrived in Africa on 12 January 1790. Kitty acquired her slaves at Cape Coast Castle and sailed from Africa on 8 March. She arrived at Morant Bay, Jamaica in May 1790 with 113 slaves.

=== Convict voyage ===
Lloyd’s Register for 1792 shows the ownership of Kitty changing to Christopher & Co., and her master from Glynn to G. Ramsey. (Note: The 43rd entry in the list of ships starting with 'K'; owner in 4th column, master in 8th column.)

Under the command of George Ramsay she sailed from England, on 31 March 1791, with 10 male and 30 female convicts and a cargo of stores. Kitty sprung a leak shortly after departure and returned to Spithead for repairs. There eight male convicts escaped. She left Portsmouth on 6 April 1792. Further repairs were undertaken at Rio de Janeiro and Cape Town before she arrived at Port Jackson, New South Wales, on 18 November 1792. Three female convicts died during the voyage. Daniel Woodriff was Naval Agent for the voyage. Kitty also brought out 282,567 pounds (128 t) of flour, 165,360 pounds (75 t) of pork, and 126,000 pounds (57 t) of beef for the colony.

Kitty, Pitt, and Royal Admiral, the three convict transports that arrived in Australia in 1792, are often referred to as the Fourth Fleet.

Woodriff reported that homeward-bound, Kitty left Port Jackson on 4 June 1793, having taken a cargo to Norfolk Island in the interim. She sailed via Cape Horn, St Catherine's, and Rio de Janeiro, before arriving at the Cove of Cork on 5 February 1794.

=== Merchantman ===
On her return from Port Jackson, Kitty became a merchantman. In 1795 Ramsey was still her master, and she was listed as being at Cork.

In 1800 Kitty's trade was London transport, and her master was A. Sterling. This entry continues to 1805, which is the last listing for her. The last listing for Kitty in the Register of Shipping is in 1800 and concurs with the listing in Lloyd's Register.

== Sources ==
- Bateson, Charles (1959). The Convict Ships. Brown, Son & Ferguson. OCLC 3778075.
- Bladen, Frank Murcot, ed. (1793). Historical Records of New South Wales. Vol. 2. C. Potter.
- Register Society (1790). Register of Ships for 1790. LLoyd's Register of Shipping. London: Register Society. hdl:2027/mdp.39015050578064. Wikidata Q133264486.
- Register Society (1792). Register of Ships for 1792. LLoyd's Register of Shipping. London: Register Society. hdl:2027/mdp.39015004281252. Wikidata Q133277371.
- Register Society (1795). Register of Ships for 1795. LLoyd's Register of Shipping. London: Register Society. hdl:2027/mdp.39015004281294. Wikidata Q133277523.
- Slave Voyages (2025). "Voyage 82180, Kitty (1790)". Slave Voyages: The Trans-Atlantic Slave Trade Database.
- Society for the Registry of Shipping (1800). The Register of Shipping for the Year 1800. LLoyd's Register of Shipping. London: H. L. Galabin. hdl:2027/mdp.39015065522479. OCLC 220123535. Wikidata Q133263777.
- Society of Merchants, Shipowners, and Underwriters (1800). The New Register Book of Shipping, for the Year 1800. LLoyd's Register of Shipping (2nd ed.). Cornhill: J. F. Foot. hdl:2027/mdp.39015021233591. OCLC 1227539875. Wikidata Q110157223.
- Tilghman, Douglas Campbell (1967). "Daniel Woodriff (1756–1842)". Australian Dictionary of Biography. Vol. 2. National Centre of Biography, Australian National University. ISBN 978-0-522-84459-7. ISSN 1833-7538. OCLC 70677943.
