= Fortitude (1780 EIC ship) =

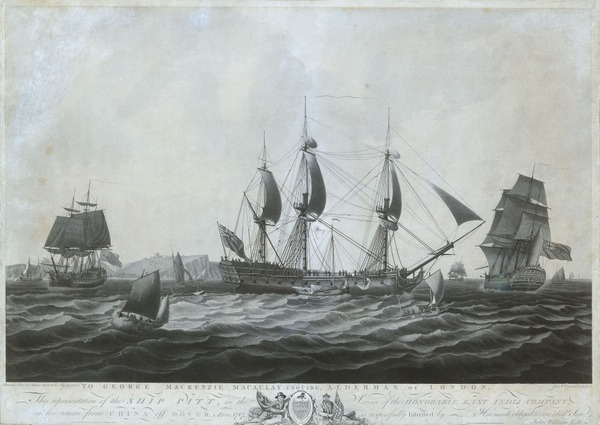
- Pitt, near Dover returning from China 1787; National Maritime Museum, Greewich, and based on a painting by Dominic Serres, National Maritime Museum, Greewich

History

Great Britain
- Name: Fortitude
- Owner: Jeffery Jackson
- Builder: Wells, Deptford
- Launched: 1780
- Captured: 23 June 1782

France
- Acquired: 1782 by capture
- Fate: Sold

Great Britain
- Name: Fortitude
- Owner: East India Company
- Acquired: By purchase
- Fate: Sold 1785

Great Britain
- Namesake: William Pitt the Elder
- Owner: EIC voyages 1-4: George Macartney Macaulay (1750-1803); EIC voyage 5: John Wells
- Acquired: 29 October 1785 by purchase
- Renamed: Pitt (1785)
- Fate: Sold 1798

Great Britain
- Name: Pitt
- Owner: Wildman & Co.
- Acquired: 1798 by purchase
- Fate: Sold for breaking up 1801

General characteristics
- Tons burthen: 761, or 775, or 77568/94 (bm)
- Length: 139 ft 4 1/2 in (42.5 m) (overall); 111 ft 9 in (34.1 m) (keel)
- Beam: 36 ft 1 1/2 in (11.0 m)
- Depth of hold: 14 ft 9 1/2 in (4.5 m)
- Complement: 1781: 110; 1793–1796: 70-80
- Armament: 1781: 26 × 12&4-pounder guns; 1793: 24 × 9-pounder guns; 1794: 12 × 6- & 4-pounder guns; 1796: 12 × 6- & 4-pounder guns

Fortitude was a merchant vessel built in 1780 on the River Thames. A French frigate captured her in 1782 while she was on the return leg of her maiden voyage to India as an East Indiaman for the British East India Company (EIC). However, the British recaptured her in October 1782. The EIC purchased her and sent her back to England. There, in 1785, George Macartney Macauley purchased her and renamed her Pitt. She then performed five voyages for the British East India Company (EIC) between 1786 and 1798. In between, she made one journey transporting convicts from England to New South Wales. She was broken up in 1801.

== Fortitude (Maiden voyage 1781) ==
Captain Charles Gregorie (or Gregory) acquired a letter of marque on 19 January 1781. He left Portsmouth on 13 March 1781 bound for Madras and Bengal. Fortitude was part of a convoy of Indiamen and transports under the escort of a British squadron under Commodore George Johnstone, who was sailing to capture the Cape Colony.

On 16 April the French attacked the British squadron and convoy at the battle of Porto Praya, off São Tiago. The French captured Fortitude, but as her captors towed her out to sea, her crew and the troops of the 92nd Regiment of Foot she was transporting, re-captured her; she rejoined the British convoy a few days later. (Note: The 92nd Regiment was the regiment that existed between 1779 and 1783. It was not the 100th Regiment of Foot, which became the 92nd (Gordon Highlanders) Regiment of Foot.)

Fortitude reached Madras on 17 August and arrived at Kedgeree on 28 September. She passed Saugor on 10 November and arrived at Madras on 10 December. Homeward-bound, she passed Kedgeree on 16 February 1782 and reached "Cockelee" on 8 May.

The French frigate Fine captured Fortitude on 23 June. When the French captured her they freed some eight men from Artésien, who had been part of the French prize crew at the battle of Porto Praya. Fine brought Fortitude to Cuddalore, where Suffren's squadron was anchored, arriving there on 29 June. The French listed her as an 800-tonne, 22-gun fluyt. In early July 1782, during the run-up of the Battle of Negapatam, Suffren sent Fortitude and Yarmouth (a 24-gun British storeship that Fine had also captured) to Île de France (Mauritius). On 1 August, he sent her to Bago to purchase rigging parts, under Captain Geslin. After the battle, Fortitude had to cede her mainmast to Pourvoyeuse, which herself had ceded hers to Brillant.

The French then sold Fortitude to Portuguese merchants at Calcutta. The EIC purchased her in October at Madras for Rs.35,000, and used her to convey General Stuart and his staff back to England.

Part of Fortitude's cargo had been intended for China. At Madras there was also cargo destined for China that had belonged to Latham and to Earl of Hertford. (Earl of Hertford had foundered at Madras on 15 October 1782.) General Coote, Francis, and Montague carried the cargo to Canton.

Fortitude arrived back in the River Thames on 21 January 1785. George Macaulay purchased her on 29 October 1785 and renamed her Pitt.

== EIC voyages 1 & 2 ==
=== EIC voyage 1 (1786–87) ===
Captain George Cowper sailed from the Downs on 28 March 1786, bound for China. Pitt arrived at Whampoa on 30 August. Homeward bound, she crossed the Second Bar, which is about 20 miles downriver from Whampoa, on 20 January 1787. She sailed via the Sunda Strait, where she saw Ranger, which too was returning to England from China.

Pitt reached St Helena on 26 May. She arrived at the Downs on 6 August. Cowper died almost immediately thereafter.

=== EIC voyage 2 (1788–89) ===
Cowper's replacement, Captain Edward Manning, left the Downs on 26 December 1788, bound for St Helena, Benkulen, and China. Pitt reached St Helena on 29 March 1789 and Benkulen on 14 July, and arrived at Whampoa on 30 November. She crossed the Second Bar on 19 February 1790, reached St Helena on 11 June, and arrived at the Downs on 7 August.

== Convict transport (1791-92) ==
Under Manning's command, Pitt sailed from Yarmouth Roads, England on 17 July 1791, with 352 male and 58 female convicts. She also carried Lieutenant-Governor Francis Grose and a company of the New South Wales Corps, as well as wives and children of the passengers and convicts. During the roughly two weeks after she left St Jago, a fever broke out that killed seven seamen, 13 soldiers, four soldiers' wives, five soldiers' children, 16 convicts, and two convicts' children. Manning had to free some convicts so that they could help man the vessel. Pitt arrived at Rio de Janeiro on 1 October, and stayed there more than three weeks, leaving on 25 October. While she was there, four convicts took advantage of their freedom to escape; another convict escaped and a soldier deserted when Pitt stopped at the Cape. Pitt arrived at Port Jackson, New South Wales on 14 February 1792. Twenty male and nine female convicts died during the voyage. Total deaths, not including children, numbered 49. Five male convicts escaped during the voyage, four in Rio and one at the Cape. At the Cape, the Dutch authorities later recaptured the escapee from Pitt, the convicted forger and future Australian artist Thomas Watling, and put him aboard Royal Admiral. (Pitt, Royal Admiral, and Kitty, the three convict transports that arrived in Australia in 1792, are often referred to as the Fourth Fleet.)

Pitt brought with her what would be Francis. Francis was a 41-ton (bm) colonial schooner that was partially constructed at the Deptford Dockyard, England, and loaded aboard Pitt in frame.

Pitt departed Port Jackson in March 1792 for England, via Batavia and Bengal. In sailing north from Port Jackson, Manning sailed through the Solomon Islands into New Georgia Sound, and then north in the passage to the Pacific between Choiseul Island and Santa Isabel Island. This he named Manning Straits, which name it retains to this day. Sikopo island (7.445°S 157.976°E) lies within the strait.

== EIC voyages 3, 4, & 5 ==
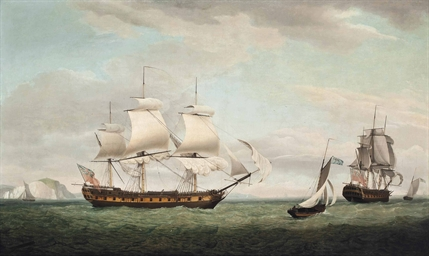
The East Indiaman Pitt of London in two positions in the Channel off the Needles, Isle of Wight (Thomas Whitcombe (London c.1752-1824)

Pitt's next three voyages took place during the French Revolutionary Wars. Her masters, like virtually all EIC captains, procured letters of marque. These authorized the captains to engage in offensive action against the French or their allies, should the occasion arise.

=== EIC voyage 3 (1792–93) ===
This voyage brought Pitt home after her voyage to Australia. Manning and Pitt left Diamond Harbour on 17 December 1792. She reached the Cape on 21 March 1793, St Helena on 14 April, Cork on 29 June, and Portsmouth on 13 July. She arrived at the Downs on 7 August. Manning was issued his first letter of marque on 23 April 1793, shortly after war began, and effectively while Pitt was between St Helena and home.

=== EIC voyage 4 (1794–95) ===
Manning received a second letter of marque on 6 June 1794. He sailed from Plymouth on 23 June 1794, bound for Bengal. Pitt reached the Cape on 9 September and Diamond Harbour on 7 December. Homeward bound, she passed Saugor on 18 February 1795, reached St Helena on 18 June and the River Shannon on 11 September, and arrived at the Downs on 15 October.

=== EIC voyage 5 (1796–98) ===
Captain John Gerrard replaced Manning for Pitt's last voyage for the EIC. (Note: His previous command had been Deptford.) He received a letter of marque on 26 May 1796, and sailed from Portsmouth on 11 August 1796, bound for Madras and Bengal. Pitt reached the Cape on 18 November and arrived at Madras on 17 February 1797. She reached Kedgeree on 28 February. She was at Diamond Harbour on 20 March. She passed Kedgeree on 1 July, and stopped at Madras again on 15 August. From there she returned to Diamond Harbour, which she reached on 23 September, and was at Calcutta on 4 October.

The reason for the to-and-fro was that the British government planned an expedition 1797–8 against Manila. (One of the Royal Navy vessels involved appears to have been HMS Sybille.) The EIC held eight regular ships, and three "dismantled ships" in India to support the expedition. None of the three went to Penang, but instead went to the Coromandel Coast with stores and back to Bengal. A peace treaty with Spain resulted in the British cancelling the planned expedition.

Of the three dismantled ships, Pitt, Lascalles, and Royal Admiral, it held Pitt for 229 days. For Pitt, he owners claimed demurrage of £6,655 6s 3d.

Gerrard sued the EIC for £4,000 for extra expenses, including £2,500 loss on the sale of investments "under prime costs". The court awarded him £250 and £750. The court further ordered that the officers of the vessels involved receive some payment. Pitt's officers received £200 in all, with her chief mate receiving £40, her purser £16, and the other officers intermediate amounts.

Homeward bound, Pitt passed Saugor on 24 December, reached the Cape on 23 April 1798, and arrived at the Downs on 2 August.

== Fate ==
In 1798 Wells sold Pitt to Wildman & Co., London. They then hired her out, under the command of Captain Sewell, to carry troops to the Cape of Good Hope. In 1801 her owners sold her for breaking up.
