= Royal Admiral (East Indiaman) =

Royal Admiral was the name of one vessel that served the East India Company (EIC), and one vessel that was going to serve the EIC, but that the Royal Navy purchased before she launched.

- Royal Admiral (1777 ship), of 498 tons (bm), made eight voyages for the EIC between 1778 and 1798 before she was sold. She then made a voyage for her new owners transporting convicts to Port Jackson. She made a return trip to England from China under contract to the EIC, and continued trading until c. 1807.
- Royal Admiral was on the stocks at Deptford when the Navy Board purchased her in 1796. The Navy renamed her HMS York and she served until 1804 when she was wrecked with the loss of all hands.
