= Deptford (1781 EIC ship) =

History

Great Britain
- Name: Deptford
- Namesake: Deptford
- Owner: Barrington Buggin
- Builder: Wells, Deptford
- Launched: 26 March 1781
- Fate: Sold 1807 for breaking up

General characteristics
- Type: East Indiaman
- Tons burthen: 784, or 78929/94 (bm)
- Length: Overall:145 ft 9 in (44.4 m); Keel:118 ft 8 in (36.2 m)
- Beam: 35 ft 3 in (10.7 m)
- Depth of hold: 14 ft 10 in (4.5 m)
- Sail plan: Full-rigged ship
- Complement: 1793:80; 1795:100
- Armament: 1793:28 × 9&4-pounder guns; 1795:26 × 19&4-pounder guns
- Notes: Three decks

Deptford was launched in 1781 as an East Indiaman. She made six apparently uneventful voyages for the British East India Company (EIC) before she was sold in 1807 for breaking up.

== Career ==
=== EIC voyage #1 (1781–1783) ===
Captain James Elkington sailed from Plymouth on 26 June 1781, bound for Madras and Bengal. Deptford was at Annabon on 10 September and St Helena on 17 October. She reached Madras on 31 March 1782 and arrived at Kedgeree on 27 May. Homeward bound, she left Bengal on 26 December, reached St Helena on 29 March 1783, and arrived at Long Reach on 28 August.

=== EIC voyage #2 (1785–1786) ===
Captain John Gerrard sailed from Portsmouth on 17 April 1785, bound for Madras and Bengal. Deptford was at Johanna on 7 August, reached Madras on 11 September and Diamond Creek on 14 October, and arrived at Kedgeree on 26 December. Homeward bound, she was at Saugor on 6 March 1786, reached St Helena on 13 June, and arrived at Gravesend on 15 August.

=== EIC voyage #3 (1787–1789) ===
Captain Gerrard sailed from The Downs on 21 December 1787, bound for Bombay and China. Deptford reached Bombay on 28 May and arrived at Whampoa anchorage on 17 October. Homeward bound, she crossed the Second Bar on 25 January 1789, reached St Helena on 10 June, and arrived at Long Reach on 25 August.

=== EIC voyage #4 (1791–1792) ===
Captain Gerrard sailed from The Downs on 16 April 1791, bound for Madras, Bencoolen, and Bengal. Deptford reached Madras on 4 July and Bencoolen on 11 September; she arrived at Diamond Harbour on 1 November. Homeward bound, she was at Saugor on 25 December and Madras on 2 January 1792, reached St Helena on 30 March, and arrived at Purfleet on 21 May.

=== EIC voyage #5 (1793–1794) ===
War with France had broken out so Captain John Gerrard acquired a letter of marque on 18 May 1793. He sailed from Portsmouth on 7 July 1793, bound for Bengal. Deptford arrived at Diamond Harbour on 18 November. Homeward bound, she was at Saugor on 20 February 1794, reached St Helena on 1 May and Galway Bay on 20 July, and arrived at Long Reach on 1 September. (Note: Gerrard's next command was Pitt.)

=== EIC voyage #6 (1795–1797) ===
Captain William Macnamara acquired a letter of marque on 15 April 1795. He sailed from Portsmouth 24 May 1795, ultimately bound for China. Deptford was part of a convoy of Indiamen that were bringing General Alured Clarke and his troops for the invasion of the Cape Colony.

Deptford and the fleet arrived at St Salvadore on 7 July.

Deptford sailed on 13 July, together with the other Indiamen, and under the escort of Sphinx. However, Sphinx ran into Warren Hastings and both vessels returned to port, Exeter accompanying them.

Deptford and the fleet reached Simon's Bay on 3 September. Deptford was at the Cape on 2 October.

After her service at the Cape was over, Deptford resumed her voyage and reached Whampoa on 6 March 1796. Homeward bound, she crossed the Second Bar on 21 June, reached St Helena on 20 November, and arrived at Long Reach on 15 February 1797.

== Fsate ==
Deptford was sold in 1797.
