= Louisiade Plateau =

Underwater plateau in the South Pacific Ocean

Coordinates: 12°30′S 156°00′E

Louisiade Plateau Louisiade Rise
- Oceanic plateau
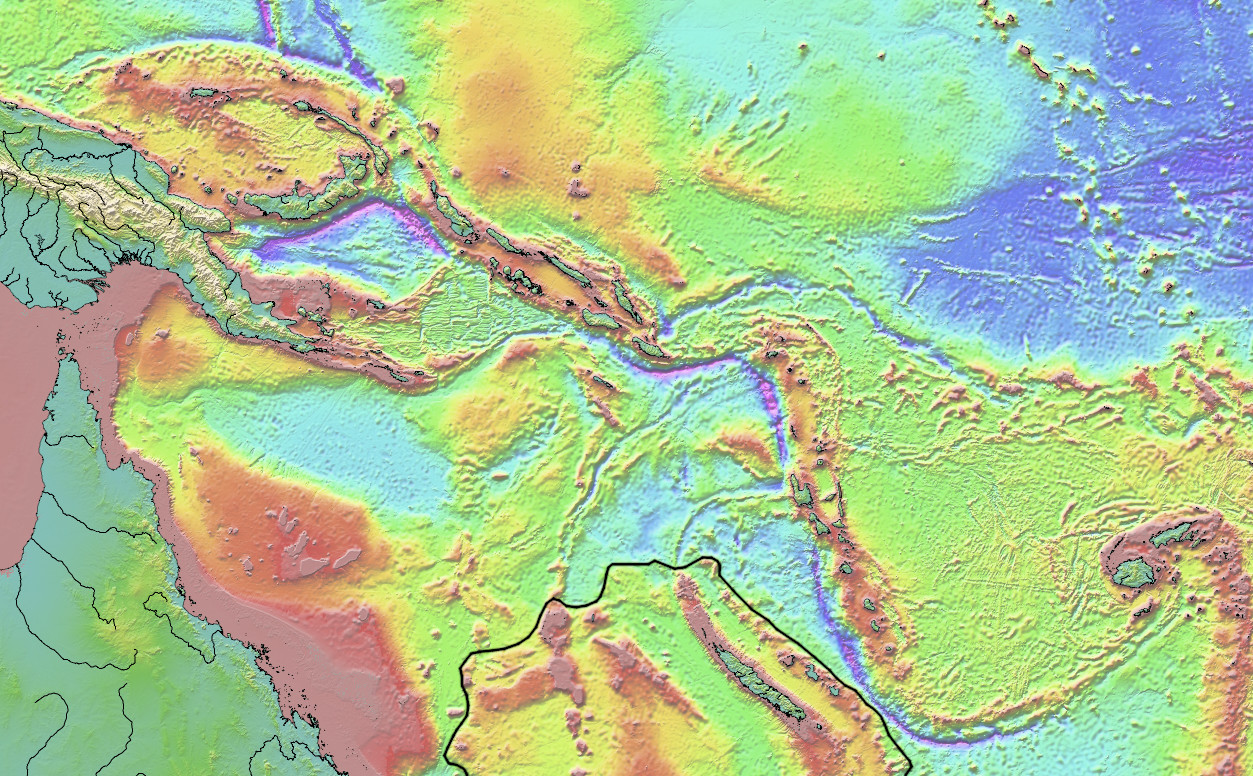
- Coral Sea and surrounds topography with Zealandia outlined

- Coordinates
- Location: Coral Sea
- Part of: Pacific Ocean floor
- Age: Eocene
- Volcanic belt: Tasmantid Seamount Chain

The Louisiade Plateau, also called the Louisiade Rise, is a poorly studied oceanic plateau in the northern Coral Sea of the South Pacific Ocean. To its west is the Louisiade Archipelago that it is named after. It has been described as a continental fragment that rifted away from the northwestern continental margin of Australia but its position at the northern end of the Tasmantid Seamount Chain also suggests that the Louisiade Plateau might be a large igneous province formed by the arrival of the Tasmantid hotspot. A sample of volcanic rock from the southern spur of the Louisiade Plateau was dated at 56.4 ± 0.6 million years ago by Ar-Ar methodology which is not inconsistent with Tasmantid Seamount Chain timings. Recent sampling however along the northernmost part of the plateau found serpentinized peridotites, mid-ocean ridge basalt and volcaniclastic breccia–conglomerates consistent with placement of oceanic crust during a subduction initiation event in the formation of this part of the plateau.
