= Bridgewater (1785 EIC ship) =

British East Indiaman 1785–1805

History

Great Britain
- Name: Bridgewater
- Owner: Nicholas Skottowe
- Operator: British East India Company
- Builder: Barnard, Deptford
- Launched: 1785, or February 1786
- Fate: Foundered 1805

General characteristics
- Tons burthen: 755, 799, or 79962/94 (bm)
- Length: Overall:143 ft 5 in (43.7 m); Keel:116 ft 0 in (35.4 m)
- Beam: 36 ft 0 in (11.0 m)
- Depth of hold: 14 ft 0 3/4 in (4.3 m)
- Sail plan: Full-rigged ship
- Complement: 1794:100; 1796:100; 1800:60
- Armament: 1793: 26 × 9&4-pounder guns; 1796:26 × 12&6-pounder guns; 1801:20 × 9-pounder guns
- Notes: Three decks

Bridgewater was launched in 1785 as an East Indiaman for the British East India Company (EIC), which engaged her for six voyages. She then made two more as an "extra ship", that is, under voyage charters, and was lost at sea in 1805 while homeward bound from Bombay on her eighth voyage.

== Career ==
EIC voyage #1 (1786–1787): Captain William Parker sailed from Portsmouth on 14 April 1786, bound for China. Bridgewater arrived at Whampoa Anchorage on 11 September. Homeward bound, she crossed the Second Bar on 1 January 1787. She sailed via the Sunda Strait, where she saw Ranger, which too was returning to England from China.

Bridgewater reached St Helena on 10 May and arrived at Long Reach on 29 June.

EIC voyage #2 (1788–1789): Captain Parker sailed from The Downs on 11 April 1788, bound for Madras and China. Bridgewater reached Madras on 19 August. She then visited Masulipatam on 13 September, before returning to Madras on 4 October. She reached Batavia on 18 November, and arrived at Whampoa on 4 February 1789. Homeward bound, she crossed the Second Bar on 2 March, was at Macao on 21 March, and reached St Helena on 28 June. She arrived back in England on 1 September.

EIC voyage #3 (1791–1793): Captain Gregory Moffat Lewin sailed from Portsmouth on 25 May 1791, bound for Madras, Bengal, and China. Bridgewater reached Madras on 9 October and arrived at Diamond Harbour on 23 November. On 5 December she passed Saugor, and by 11 January 1792 was at Vizagapatam. She stopped at Madras on 22 January and Nagore on 7 February. She returned to Madras on 16 February, and reached Bombay on 29 March. On 29 May she was again at Madras. Finally bound for China, she reached Penang on 14 July and Malacca on 1 September, before arriving at Whampoa on 19 September. Captain Lewin died two days before Bridgewater left for England. Her chief mate was Robert Reay. Homeward bound, she crossed the Second Bar on 12 November, reached St Helena on 19 February 1793, and arrived at Long Reach on 22 April.

France declared war on Great Britain on 1 February 1793.

EIC voyage #4 (1794–1795): Capt William Parker acquired a letter of marque on 6 January 1794.

The British government held Bridgewater at Portsmouth, together with several other Indiamen in anticipation of using them as transports for an attack on Île de France (Mauritius). It gave up the plan and released the vessels in May 1794. It paid £1,479 3s 4d for having delayed her departure by 71 days.

Captain Parker sailed from Portsmouth on 2 May 1794, bound for Bombay and China. Bridgewater reached Bombay on 4 September and arrived at Whampoa on 26 February 1795. Homeward bound, she crossed the Second Bar on 22 April and was in Macao on 22 May. She reached Batavia on 5 August and St Helena on 16 October, and arrived at Northfleet on 26 December.

EIC voyage #5 (1796–1797): Captain John Skottowe acquired a letter of marque on 20 April 1796. He sailed from Portsmouth on 17 May 1796, bound for Madras and Bengal. Bridgewater reached Madras on 10 September and arrived at Diamond Harbour on 21 October. Homeward bound, she passed Saugor on 2 January 1797. She was at Colombo on 2 February and Trincomalee on 25 March. She reached the Cape of Good Hope on 12 July and St Helena on 11 September, and arrived at Gravesend on 18 December.

EIC voyage #6 (1798–1799): Captain Skottowe sailed from Portsmouth on 29 April 1798, bound for China. She reached Rio de Janeiro on 6 July, and arrived at Whampoa on 3 December. Homeward bound, she crossed the Second Bar on 22 January 1799, reached Malacca on 22 February and St Helena on 17 May, and arrived at Long Reach on 31 July.

EIC voyage #7 (1800–1801): Captain George Lukin acquired a letter of marque on 9 December 1800. Messrs Princip & Saunders had tendered her to the EIC to bring back rice from Bengal. She was one of 28 vessels that sailed on that mission between December 1800 and February 1801.

Lukin sailed from The Downs on 24 January 1801, bound for Madras. Bridgewater reached Madras on 21 May and left on 14 August. On 10 October she was reported sailing 'towards England'. She arrived back in England on 4 January 1802.

EIC voyage #8 (1802–Loss): Captain E. H. Palmer sailed from England on 1 August 1802, bound for Botany Bay and China. Bridgewater arrived at Port Jackson on 12 May 1803, having brought provisions. She left on 10 August, bound for China. She left in company with HMS Porpoise and Cato.

On 17 August the three ships got caught near a sandbank, 157 north and 51 miles east of Sandy Cape. With shrinking leeway, both Cato and Porpoise grounded. Both ships beat on the sharp coral, with the result that they sank quickly. Bridgewater sailed on and later reported both ships lost with no survivors. Almost all the crew and passengers of Cato and Porpoise were able to land on a sandbank as both ships broke up; the survivors were later rescued.

== Fate ==
Bridgewater sailed from Bombay for England in 1805 and disappeared without a trace. She was believed to have foundered with all hands.
