= HMS Porpoise (1799) =

Shipwreck in Queensland, Australia

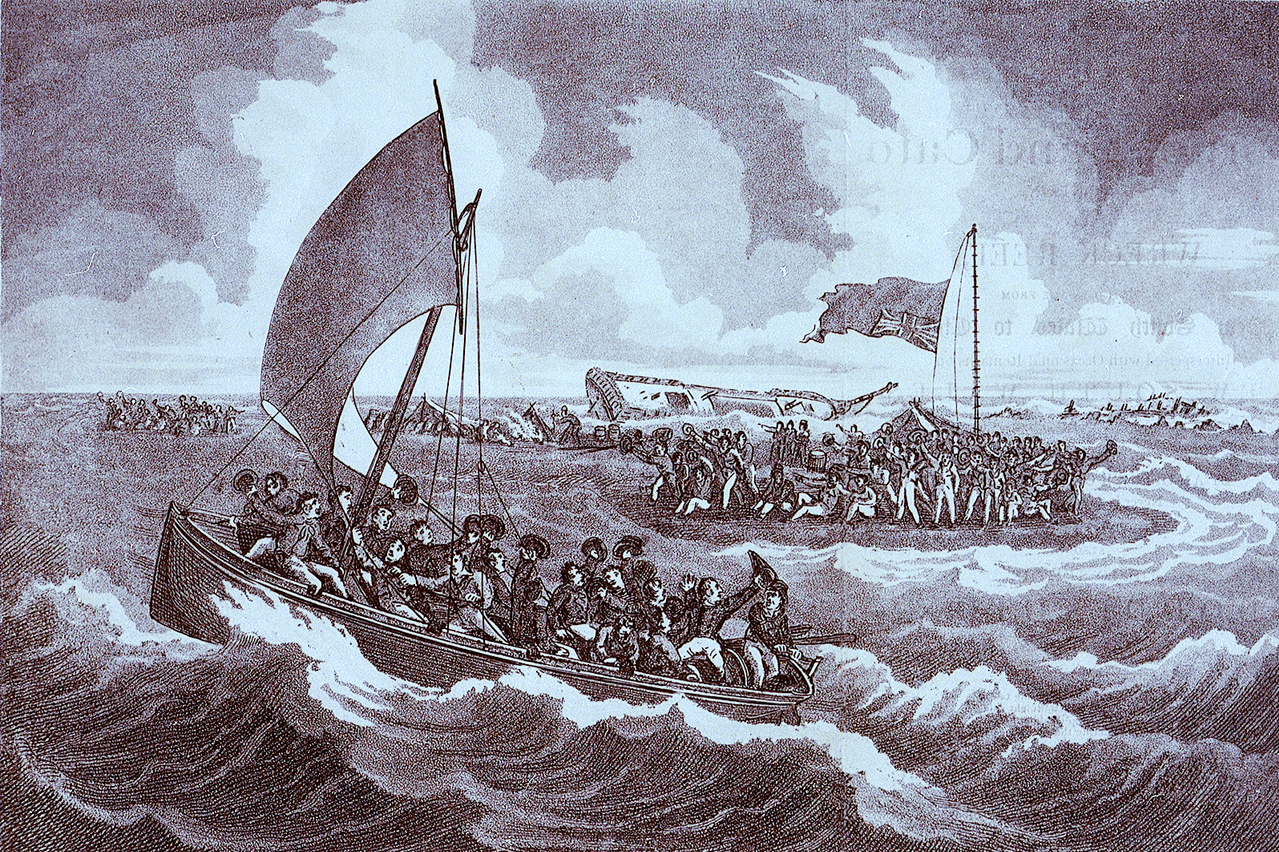
- Crews of Porpoise and Cato evacuating their ships

History

Spain
- Name: Infanta Amelia
- Builder: Dockyard, Bilbao
- Launched: c.1799
- Captured: 6 August 1799

Great Britain
- Name: HMS Porpoise
- Launched: 6 August 1799 by capture
- Fate: Wrecked 17 August 1803

General characteristics
- Type: sloop
- Tons burthen: 308 (bm)
- Length: 93 ft 0 in (28.35 m) (overall); 74 ft 4 in (22.7 m) (keel)
- Beam: 27 ft 11 in (8.51 m)
- Depth of hold: 12 ft 3 in (3.73 m)
- Propulsion: Sails
- Sail plan: Schooner
- Armament: 10 × 6-pounder guns

HMS Porpoise was a 12-gun sloop-of-war originally built in Bilbao, Spain, as the packet ship Infanta Amelia. On 6 August 1799 HMS Argo captured her off the coast of Portugal. Porpoise wrecked in 1803 on the North coast of what was then part of the Colony of New South Wales, now called Wreck Reefs, off the coast of Queensland, Australia.

== Service ==
Porpoise was commissioned in October 1799 under Lieutenant William Scott as a storeship for New South Wales. She sailed in April and arrived on 7 November 1800 in Port Jackson.

She carried a selection of useful European plants, arranged by Sir Joseph Banks and provided by Brentford nurseryman Hugh Ronalds, to replace those lost in HMS Guardian. George Suttor was engaged as gardener to prepare the plants and care for them on the voyage. In return he received free passage for himself and his family.

Governor Philip Gidley King appointed himself captain of Porpoise on 6 November 1800, but left actual command in Scott's hands. Scott took her to Norfolk Island on at least two voyages and to Otaheite to bring back salt pork in exchange for arms, among other goods. King had an agreement with King Pōmare I under which Pōmare sought to monopolize the trade in salt pork.

In June 1803, Porpoise, with HMS Lady Nelson, under the command of Lieutenant George Courtoys, set out from Sydney for the Derwent River in Van Diemen's Land in order to establish the first European occupation of what is now Tasmania. Bad weather forced both vessels to return to Sydney.

== Wreck and loss ==
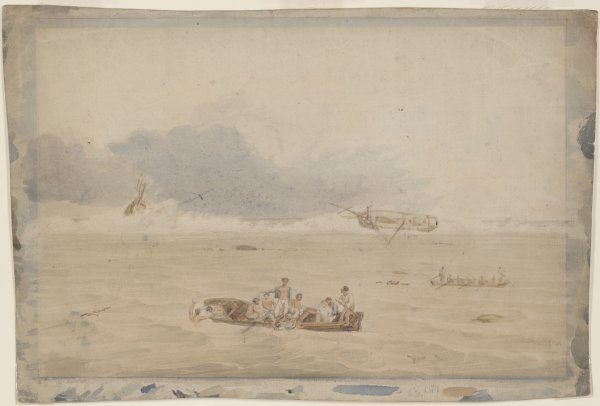
Wreck of the Porpoise, William Westall, 1803, National Library of Australia

On 10 August 1803, Porpoise left Sydney under the command of Lieutenant Robert Fowler and in the company of Cato, under Captain John Park, and the East Indiaman Bridgewater, under Captain Palmer, bound for India. On 17 August the three ships got caught near a sandbank, 157 north and 51 miles east of Sandy Cape. With shrinking leeway, both the Cato and Porpoise grounded. Both ships beat on the sharp coral, with the result that they sank quickly. Bridgewater sailed on and later reported both ships lost with no survivors. The crew and passengers of Cato and Porpoise were able to land on a sandbank as both ships broke up.

Matthew Flinders, who was returning to England as a passenger on Porpoise, together with his charts and logbooks, believed that Captain Palmer sailed on despite knowing that the other two ships had come to grief. Another passenger was the artist William Westall, many of whose works were damaged in the wrecking. On 26 August 1803, with no sign of rescue, Flinders and Park took the largest cutter, which they named Hope. Together with twelve crewmen they headed to Sydney to seek rescue.

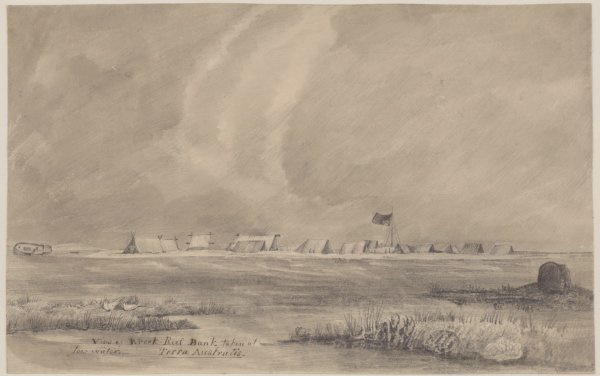
William Westall, View of Wreck Reef bank taken at low water, Terra Australis, 1803

Using their navigation skills, Hope made the 800 mile voyage to Port Jackson by 8 September. Three lives had been lost in the joint shipwreck but the ship Rolla and the schooners Cumberland and Francis were able to rescue all the remaining passengers. Francis returned to Sydney with some of the men. Cumberland, with Flinders, went to the Torres Straits and on to Île de France, where the French governor imprisoned him for five years and seven months. Lieutenants Fowler, Flinders (Matthew Flinders' brother), and John Franklin sailed with Rolla to China. They then took passage on the East Indiaman Earl Camden under Commodore Nathaniel Dance. They therefore participated in the Battle of Pulo Aura. Fowler took command of the upper deck, where he distinguished himself, and Franklin was in charge of the signals.

== Wreck site ==
In 1965 Ben Cropp found the wreck sites of the Cato and Porpoise (22.1939°S 155.3558°E) at Wreck Reefs after extensive research and only fifteen minutes of actual diving. The site is now a protected area with the designation dating to 29 April 1992.
