= Ranger (1780 ship) =

History

Great Britain
- Name: Ranger
- Launched: 1776, France
- Fate: Last listed in 1793

General characteristics
- Tons burthen: 520, or 537, or 53748/94, or 600 (bm)
- Length: Overall: 120 ft 0 in (36.6 m); Keel: 95 ft 11 in (29.2 m)
- Beam: 32 ft 5 1/2 in (9.9 m)
- Depth of hold: 13 ft 4 in (4.1 m)
- Armament: 1781: 22 × 24-pounder + 10 × 12-pounder carronades

Ranger was launched in 1776 in France, possibly as an East Indiaman for the French East India Company, and almost certainly under another name. From 1780 to 1786 she was a British vessel that was a transport and traded generally. In 1786–1787 she made one voyage for the British East India Company (EIC). From 1788 she traded between London and Ostend, and was last listed in 1793 with unchanged data. In 1788 she had sailed to the East Indies, perhaps with new owners from Ostend, and may have remained in the East Indies.

== Origin ==
A key source states that Ranger was built in France in 1776 for the French East India Company. It goes on to say that vessel was taken in prize in 1777, and that the Admiralty purchased her for use as an armed ship that it named Ranger. The source goes on to say that in 1785 Anthony Calvert, of London, purchased Ranger.

Some parts of this account have supporting data, and other parts do not. Lloyd's Register (LR) described Ranger as having been built in France in 1776, though neither earlier nor later volumes refer to her as a prize. As Britain and France were not at war with each other in 1777, the idea that Ranger was taken in prize in that year is improbable.

The National Maritime Museum's database shows a hired armed ship Ranger with a 1777-year, but the actual dates of commissioning and commanders are in the period 1780 to 1783. From 1780 to 1782, and then until 1788 Calvert & Co. owned Ranger. In 1782 Lloyd's List had mentions of a Ranger armed ship and a Ranger armed storeship, and a Ranger, Elliotson, master, which had arrived at Plymouth from Gibraltar. Whether these mentions represent one, two, or three vessels is currently unclear.

== Career ==
Ranger first appeared in Lloyd's Register (LR) in 1781. It is unfortunate that the online version of the 1780 Lloyd's Register is missing the pages from "R" on because it is probable that her first appearance would have been in the missing pages; she did not appear in the 1779 volume.

Year	Master	Owner	Trade	Source & notes
1781	T.Martin	Calvert & Co.	London–New York	LR
1782	E.Elliston	A.Calvert	London transport	LR
1783	E.Elliston	A.Calvert	London transport	LR
1784	E.Elliston; J.Duncan	A.Calvert	Gibraltar–Portsmouth	LR
1785				No online volume
1786	J.Duncan	A.Calvert	London	LR

EIC voyage (1786–1787): The EIC chartered Ranger as an "extra ship" to make one voyage. Before she left, Brent repaired Ranger. Captain Edmund Elliston sailed from the Downs on 11 April 1786, bound for China. Ranger arrived at Whampoa Anchorage on 8 September. Homeward bound, she crossed the Second Bar on 16 January 1787. She reached Manila Bay on 27 January. There she heard that Hastings had been dismasted and had had to put into Antique, Island Paney. Ranger left on 1 February and sailed via the Sunda Strait, where she saw several East Indiamen: Bridgewater, Hillsborough, and Pitt. Bridgewater and Pitt were homeward bound from China, and Hillsborough was on her way to Bombay from Batavia.

Ranger reached St Helena on 25 April. She sailed from there on 30 April, and arrived back at the Downs on 23 June.

Reportedly, on this voyage Elliston suppressed a mutiny. Two ringleaders, Henry Parsons and George Steward were gibbeted on 21 January 1788 at Execution Dock, Wapping.

Ranger was not listed in 1787, and there is no online volume of Lloyd's Register for 1788. Reportedly, Ranger was sold in 1788 to Camden & Co., of London. (Note: This same source states that she was sold as a West Indiaman, but was extensively hired as a troopship and convict transport to Botany Bay. There is no record of an convict transport named Ranger, and a newspaper listing of all vessels that called at Port Jackson from the establishment of the colony to the end of 1817 makes no mention of any vessel named Ranger.)

Year	Master	Owner	Trade	Source
1789	D.Trail	Camden & Co.	London–Ostend	LR

On 28 February 1788 Ranger, Trail, master, sailed from Ostend for the East Indies.

== Fate ==
Ranger was last listed in 1793 with data unchanged since 1789.
