= Wreck Reefs =

Reef in Australia

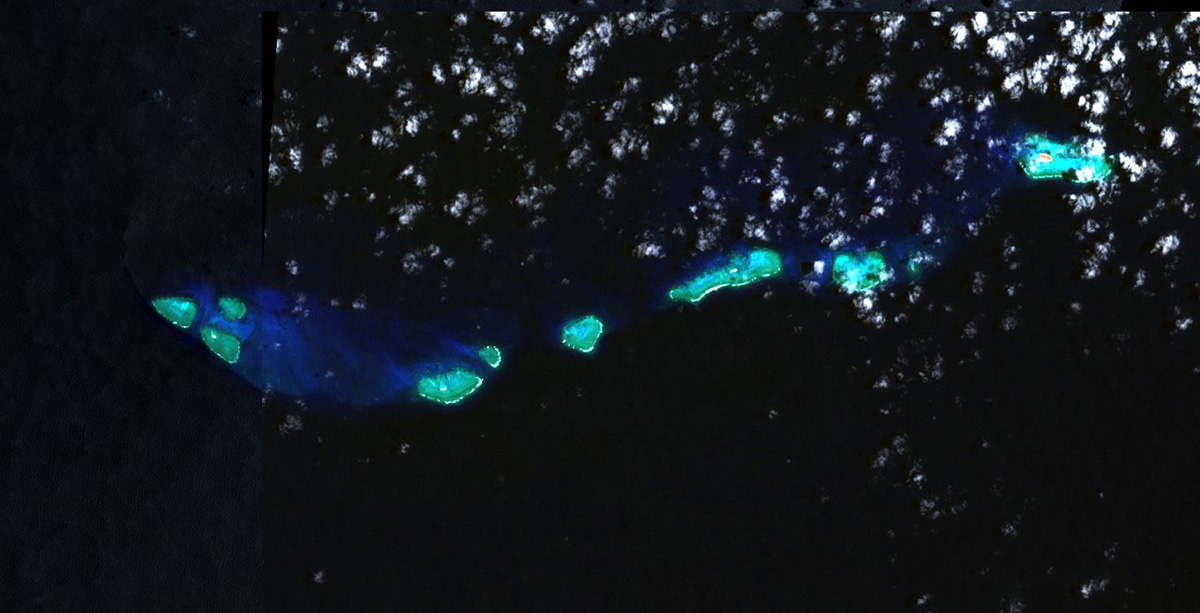
- Satellite View of Wreck Reefs

- Location within Pacific Ocean
- Named seamounts in Tasmantid Seamount Chain with Wreck Reefs labelled in red (red pushpins – coral reefs, yellow pushpins – seamounts)

Location
- Group: Tasmantid Seamount Chain
- Coordinates: 22°11′S 155°20′E

Geology
- Type: Atoll

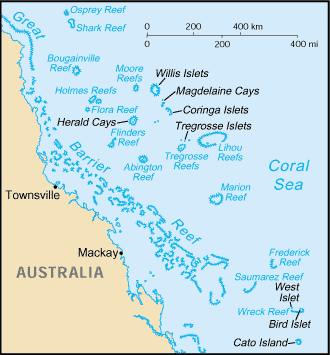
Map of the Coral Sea Islands

The Wreck Reefs are located in the southern part of the Coral Sea Islands approximately 450 kilometres (280 mi) east-north-east of Gladstone, Queensland, Australia.

Approximately 250 kilometres (130 nmi; 160 mi) east of the Swain Reefs complex they form a narrow chain of reefs with small cays that extends for around 25 kilometres (13 nmi; 16 mi) in a west-to-east line.

Islets found on the reefs include Bird Islet, West Islet and Porpoise Cay.

The reef gained its name through the sinking of HMS Porpoise and Cato which were lost on Wreck Reefs. In 1803 Matthew Flinders embarked at Port Jackson as a passenger aboard Porpoise, which had been refitted to carry his collection of plants and papers. Cato and Bridgewater accompanied them. Eight days later (17 August) disaster stuck with Porpoise and Cato striking the uncharted reefs giving cause to the naming of the area. The area is protected as a historic wreck site.

== Geography ==
The reef complex are approximately 100 km (62 mi) south east from Kenn Reefs, 150 km (93 mi) south east from the Saumarez Reefs and 120 kilometres (75 mi) north-north-west of Cato Island.

Wreck Reefs atoll consists of a narrow chain of reefs and cays which is approximately 25 km (16 mi) by 5 km (3.1 mi) west to east with an area of 75 km^{2} (29 sq mi) and is open from the north. The sea always breaks over the cays.

The coral reefs are situated on the top of a large shield volcano, produced by eruptions of the Tasmantid Seamount Chain.

Cays found on the reefs include Bird Islet, West Islet and Porpoise Cay.

Bird Islet 22°10′S 155°28′E, is a mound measuring some 500 m (1,600 ft) by 250 m (820 ft) and 6 m (20 ft) high with a bare centre surrounded by a ring of herbage. It is the only one known to have any significant vegetation in the chain, and it has a reef 4.5 km (2.8 mi) long.

Porpoise Cay, is 275 m (902 ft) long, 90 m (300 ft) across and 3 m (9.8 ft) high. It has a few low plants and lies 11 km (6.8 mi) west of Bird Islet in the centre of a shallow lagoon surrounded by a reef. The reef partially uncovers at low tide.

West Islet 22°12′S 155°10′E, is 1.8 m (5 ft 11 in) high and bare, and lies near the middle of the southeast of three detached reefs at the west end of Wreck Reefs. A below-water reef surrounds West Islet.

== History ==
=== Discovery ===
In 1803 when Matthew Flinders left Port Jackson for the last time in HMS Porpoise, in company with Cato and Bridgewater, he sailed by the Outer Route to Torres Strait. Wreck Reef, or rather the chain of reefs on which Porpoise and Cato were wrecked on the morning of 17 August (when Bridgewater left them to their fate), being on the eastern side of the barrier and about eighteen and a half miles in length and from a quarter to a mile and a half in breadth. It consists of patches of coral reef separated by navigable channels and is the home of seabirds and turtle. The eastern end of it, named, Flinders said, "not improperly," Bird Islet, was found to be covered with coarse grass and shrubs. After striking, "Porpoise took a fearful heel over on her larboard beam ends," fortunately falling towards the reef so that her people were saved. Cato, under Captain Park, struck about two cables length away and "fell on her broadside," when her masts instantly disappeared. Several of the seamen were bruised against the coral rocks and three young lads drowned. One of the poor boys who had been shipwrecked no less than three or four times before—in every voyage that he had made—clung to a spar beside his captain and through the night bewailed that he "was the persecuted Jonas who carried misfortune wherever he went." He lost his hold among the breakers, was swept away, and seen no more.

The shipwrecked men gained the dry sand in the center of the reef and prepared their encampment. While searching for firewood that night they discovered a ship's spar and a piece of timber, rotten and worm-eaten, which, in the opinion of the master of Porpoise, was part of the stern-post of a ship of about 400 tons. Flinders presumed that it had belonged to one of Lapérouse's ships but the wrecks of Boussole and Astrolabe were later discovered off Vanikoro in the Santa Cruz Islands. In more recent years timber as well as coins and other relics from a Spanish galleon have been recovered within the reefs, where they had been sheltered and preserved, perhaps embedded in some sandy shallow, so that it is not improbable that both sternpost and spar came from a long-lost Spanish vessel. Another theory is that the ship was an American whaler. Flinders and thirteen others including Captain Parker, rowed back to Sydney in the ship's cutter; this boat was given the name "Hope" and sailing on 26 August to Port Jackson. For the relief of the shipwrecked crews Governor King dispatched Rolla and two schooners, HMS Cumberland and Francis. Leaving Port Jackson at daylight on 21 September Flinders reached Wreck Reef eight days later, to the relieve of the shipwrecked crews.

During his absence some of his old officers of Investigator—among whom, besides Robert Fowler, were Samuel Flinders and John Franklin—superintended the building of a small, decked ship, which was named Resource. On being manned she was placed in charge of Denis Lacy, formerly master's mate of Investigator.

The officers and men of Porpoise and Cato were distributed among the four ships. Those who preferred to return to Port Jackson sailed back in Francis and Resource; others, including Lieutenants Fowler and Samuel Flinders and John Franklin, sailed in Rolla to China, where they obtained passages to Europe. Matthew Flinders, with ten officers and seamen, embarked in Cumberland (the little schooner of twenty-nine ton lent by Governor King). Flinders, who was intending to proceed to England, was forced to call at Mauritius, where the French detained him for seven and a half years.

=== Guano Mining ===
On 27 October 1862, the British government granted an exclusive concession to exploit the guano on Lady Elliot Island, Wreck Reefs, Swain Reefs, Raine Island, Bramble Cay, Brampton Shoal, and Pilgrim Island to the Anglo-Australian Guano Company organised by the whaler, Dr. W.L. Crowther in Hobart, Tasmania. They were apparently most active on Bird Islet (Wreck Reefs) and Lady Elliot and Raine Islands, losing five ships at Bird Islet between 1861 and 1882.

Informal mining of this type probably took place in and before this period (1860s) with Crowther having said to have commenced removing guano from Wreck Reef prior to this with the one hundred tons of guano had been loaded onto the Harp when that boat was shipwrecked on the reef.

A good description of the original uses of the island is given in the following 1870s newspaper report:

Bird Island is a coral island, and one of the group known as Wreck Reef It is just one mile in circumference, and its surface rises about twelve feet above the sea level. Bird Island is leased from the Imperial Government by the Anglo Australasian Guano Company, whose headquarters are at Hobart town. The island is covered with deposits of guano of primo quality, und has been worked to great advantage for seven or eight years part. From 6000 to 8000 tons of guano have been already removed from the Island, and it is estimated that some 6000 tons still remain To remove this quantity, or in technical phraseology, to "work out the island," will occupy five or six years, as operations have to be suspended during the summer or hurricane season Last year, eighteen men and two boys, besides the superintendent, were employed on the island, but next year it is intended to increase the working force to thirty men.

Bird Island guano would be worth in England £15 per ton, but the company, preferring moderate profits and quick returns, inevitably dispose of the deposit in Tasmania, where it is in active and yearly increasing demand as a fertiliser of the soil, and where it realises £8 per ton on an average about five cargoes are shipped to Tasmania annually. There is a strong popular prejudice against guano vessels, but we are assured that there is no disagreeable smell from the Bird island deposit. It has an odour of ammonia, and is considered by the men employed on the island extremely healthful.

The guano removed by the A A Company in past years was an alluvial deposit, of winch only about 1200 tons now remain on the island That now being worked is known as "rock" guano, breaking like freestone, and when pounded with large mallets or rollers the phosphate impregnating it glistens like crystal It seems that during the hurricane season large quantities of sand are blown over the island from the beach, and consequently the men have to remove a layer of sand before beginning to remove the guano.

The " rock " deposit now being removed is much richer than the alluvial ever was The rain water, in passing through the alluvial, drained the phosphates and ammonia through the stratum of sand into the second layer of guano, thus enriching it as a fertiliser, and causing it to solidify after a lapse of time, until, as before stated, it becomes almost as hard as freestone This rock guano is therefore dug out and crushed by a great expenditure of labour.

It is then dried and carried into the sheds, ready for shipment.

The depth of the deposit on the island is about five feet six inches. Below each layer of guano is a stratum of sand, and it has no; yet been ascertained how many layers of the deposit will be found to exist. Guano islands are believed to be thus formed: The coral rock rises above, the sea, and is made the resting-place of countless flocks of birds. In the course of years they cover the whole surface of the rock; with a deposit of from two to three foot in depth. One of those tremendous hurricanes which periodically recur in the Pacific then covers the whole deposit with a layer of sand. The birds again accumulate a deposit, which in its turn is also covered with sand. In this way the island gradually rises above the sea level, mid ultimately yields the product which fertilises the exhausted soil of the agriculturist. It may be presumed that the lower strata are solidified partly by the drainage of ammonia and phosphate from above, and partly by the great weight of the super incumbent deposits.

The Bird Island Guano is much preferred to that procured at Lady Elliott's Island, and hence the intention to secure a larger quantity to market next year. Hitherto cargoes have been obtained with considerable risk, but a new mooring ground is about to be prepared where vessels will be able to lie with perfect safety alongside the wharf, inside the reef which .encircles the island. It is believed that there are other deposits of guano in the neighbourhood of Wreck Reef, and in consequence Mr, Strachan has been commissioned to explore some other islands in the vicinity. We hope he will be successful, although it is a matter for regret that the people of Queensland do not participate in it. Our Southern neighbours are making fortunes out of the guano islands and pearl fisheries at our very doors, and no one among us seems either able or willing to share in the enterprise.

== Known Shipwrecks on the Reef ==
- Cato.
- Porpoise

In 1965 after extensive research and only fifteen minutes of actual diving Ben Cropp & Jiri Hrbac found the wreck sites of Cato and Porpoise.

- Marcia. Schooner. Captain James Aickin returned to Wreck Reef, Great Barrier Reef, in April 1804 to salvage what he could from Porpoise and Cato.
- Lion. The American whaler Lion was lost on Wreck Reef on 4 December 1856' Five open boats left the scene succeeded in reaching Wide Bay, after being four days in the boats. Waratah, on a trip down from Wide Bay, picked up a boat with part of the crew and subsequently fell in with four more boats containing the captain and the remaining portion of the crew. The crew (40 in number) were all landed safely at Maryborough. The captain and great many of them then transferred onto Sydney. The vessel was constructed in Providence (Rhode Island) as a whaler and lost while whaling. The master was WH Hardwick.
- Lone Star. On 10 September 1870 the schooner Lone Star stuck Wreck Reef and within an hour after striking became a total wreck. The crew from the whaling station on Bird Island helped salvage her gear. Then on the 27th the captain and three members of the crew set out for Keppel Bay.
