= Gascoyne Seamount =

Submerged volcano off the east coast of Australia

- Location within Pacific Ocean
- Named seamounts in Tasmantid Seamount Chain with Gascoyne Seamount labelled in red (red pushpins – coral reefs, yellow pushpins – seamounts)

Location
- Location: 500 km (310 mi) east of Bermagui, New South Wales, Australia
- Group: Tasmantid Seamount Chain
- Coordinates: 36°39′32.2″S 156°12′20.2″E

Geology
- Type: Guyot

Gascoyne Seamount, also called Gascoyne Guyot or Gascoyne Tablemount, is a guyot in the Tasman Sea of the South Pacific Ocean.

== Geography ==
Located 500 km (310 mi) east of the Australian coastal town of Bermagui, Gascoyne Seamount is the southernmost and youngest significant seamount of the Tasmantid Seamount Chain. This is an underwater mountain range extending some 1,300 km (810 mi) to the north. The Tasmantid Seamount Chain has resulted from the Indo-Australian Plate moving northward over a stationary hotspot.

=== Geology ===
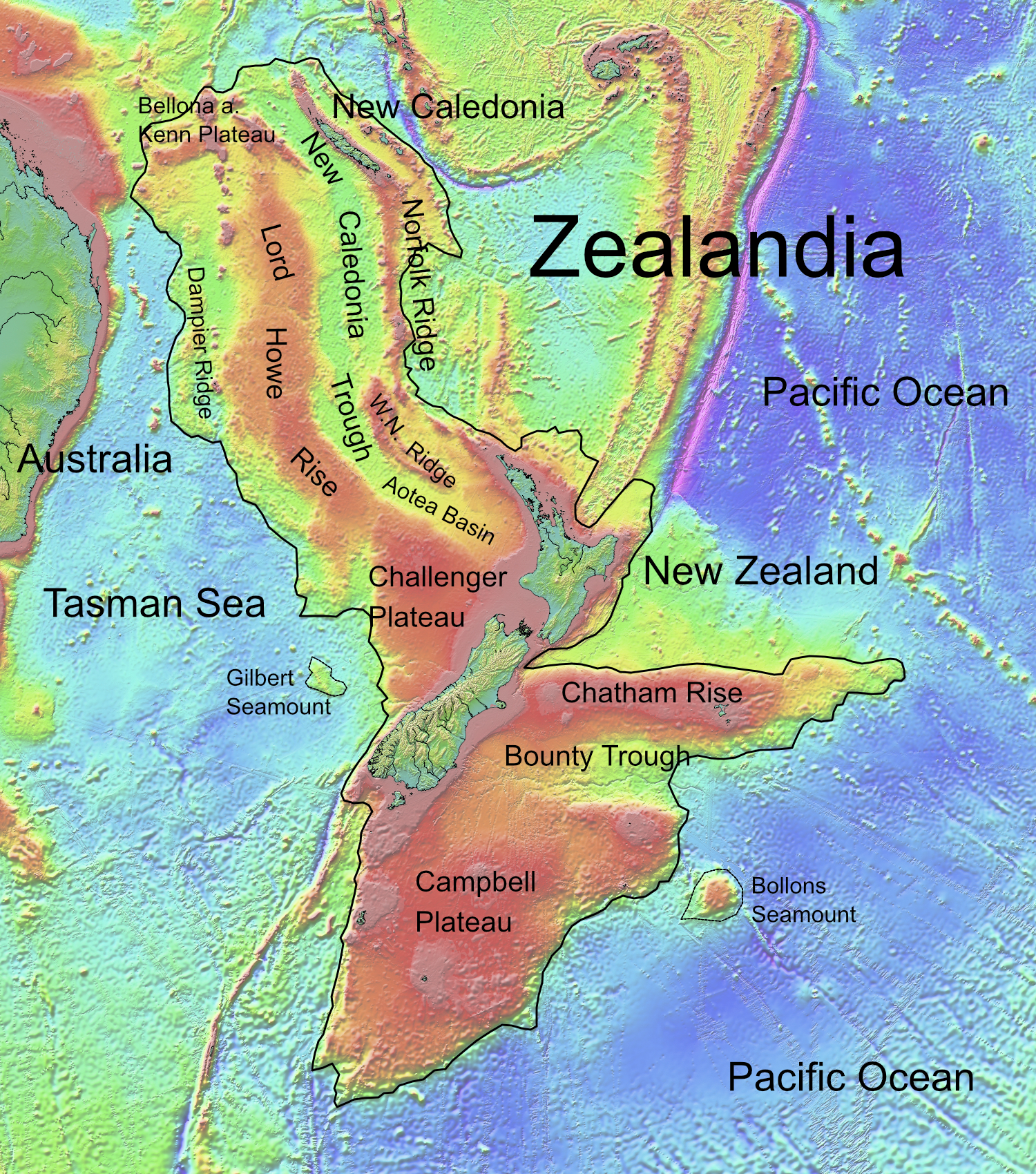
Topographic map of Zealandia that includes the Gascoyne Seamount at the bottom of the Tasman Sea and the line of the Tasmantid hotspot seamounts off the east coast of Australia.

The seamount is about 7 million years old. It incorporates a tropical to subtropical, very shallow water calcareous algal/encrusting foraminiferid biota, suggesting deposition in water 15 to 20 m (49 to 66 ft) deep. Age diagnostic forms have not been recovered.

Gascoyne Seamount is named after HMAS Gascoyne, one of two ships in the Royal Australian Navy assigned to Australian programs in the International Indian Ocean Expedition, which took place from 1960 to 1965.
