= Hillsborough (1783 EIC ship) =

British East Indiaman and later convict transport and whaling ship

History

Great Britain
- Name: Hillsborough
- Namesake: Viscount Hillsborough
- Owner: Robert Preston (Note: Preston had been captain of the previous Hillsborough when she was captured by a combined Spanish and French fleet during the Action of 9 August 1780.)
- Operator: British East India Company
- Builder: Perry & Co., Blackwall Yard
- Launched: 9 September 1783
- Fate: Sold in 1798

Great Britain
- Name: Hillsborough
- Owner: Daniel Bennett
- Acquired: 1798
- Fate: Broken up in 1804

General characteristics
- Tons burthen: 764, or 76459/94, or 781, or 784 (bm)
- Length: 143 ft 9 in (43.82 m) (overall); 116 ft 9.5 in (35.598 m) (keel)
- Beam: 35 ft 1 in (10.69 m)
- Depth of hold: 14 ft 10 in (4.52 m)
- Complement: 1793: 99; 1801: 70
- Armament: 1793: 26 × 9-pounder guns; 1801: 22 × 9-pounder guns
- Notes: One source states that her registration was cancelled in 1801 after her demolition, but other records indicate she continued sailing until 1804.

Hillsborough was a three-decker merchant ship launched in 1783. She made six voyages to India and China as an East Indiaman for the British East India Company (EIC) between 1784 and 1798. In 1798, she was sold to new owners and repurposed to transport convicts from England to New South Wales. After delivering her convicts in 1799, she operated as a whaler in the South Seas fisheries until her dismantling in 1804.

== East Indiaman ==
=== Voyage #1 (1784–85) ===
Captain William Hardcastle left the Downs on 27 January 1784 for Madras and Bengal. Hillsborough reached Simon's Bay on 24 April and arrived at Madras on 11 July. She then arrived at Kedgeree on 8 August. For her return voyage she passed Saugor on 8 February 1785, reached the Cape on 5 May and St Helena on 5 June, and arrived at the Downs on 17 August.

=== Voyage #2 (1786–89) ===
Captain William Hardcastle left the Downs on 13 March 1786, bound for Bengal, Bombay, and China. Hillsborough was part of a convoy that also included the East Indiamen Prince William, Lord Thurlow, William Pitt, Barwell, Earl of Oxford, Fort William, London, Glatton, Houghton, Marquis of Landsdown, Pigot, Ceres, and Earl of Abergavenny, amongst numerous other vessels, merchant and military, most of the non-Indiamen travelling to the Mediterranean. (Note: The news account states that Osterley was in the convoy, but in March 1786 she was still returning from an earlier trip to China.)

Hillsborough reached Simon's Bay on 10 June and Diamond Point on 14 August. From there she sailed to Batavia, which she reached on 30 December. to Bombay via the Sunda Strait, where she saw Ranger, which was returning to England from China.

On 23 May 1787 she was at Bombay. She reached Malacca on 24 August and Whampoa on 11 October. For her homeward voyage she crossed the Second Bar, some 20 miles down the river from Whampoa, on 19 February 1788. She reached Benkulen on 23 May and St Helena on 2 October, and arrived at the Downs on 7 February 1789.

=== Voyage #3 (1790–91) ===
Captain Edward Coxwell left the Downs on 17 April 1790 for China, and arrived at Whampoa on 27 August. Hillsborough crossed the Second Bar on 19 December, reached the Cape on 9 April 1791 and St Helena on 28 April, and arrived at the Downs on 27 June.

=== Voyage #4 (1793–94) ===
The French Revolutionary Wars having broken out, Captain Edward Brown received a letter of marque on 17 April 1793. He left Portsmouth on 22 May 1793 for Madras and Bengal. Hillsborough arrived at Madras on 13 September, and Diamond Harbour on 3 November. On her return voyage she passed Saugor on 27 December, and reached Madras on 31 January 1794. By 1 May she was at St Helena. On 20 July she reached Galway, and on 27 August she arrived at the Downs.

=== Voyage #5 (1795–96) ===
Captain Richard Hutt left Portsmouth on 24 May 1795, bound for Madras and Bengal. Hillsborough arrived at Madras on 2 September and Diamond Harbour on 6 October. On 4 December she passed Saugor, reaching Madras on 7 Feb 1796 and St Helena on 7 May, and arriving at the Downs on 3 August.

=== Voyage #6 (1797–98) ===
Hutt left Portsmouth on 18 March 1797, bound for Madras. Hillsborough reached the Cape on 4 June and arrived at Madras on 7 August. By 24 December she was back at the Cape. She reached St Helena on 3 February 1798 and Cork on 24 June. On her way, on 27 May, Hillsborough captured the sloop Rosario (or was in sight at the capture). Hillsborough arrived at the Downs on 7 July.

== Convict transport and whaler ==
Robert Preston and the other owners sold Hillsborough and she disappeared from the list of the EIC's ships. (Note: Hackman reports that her registration was cancelled, her demolition being complete. This is clearly incorrect.) Her new owner was Daniel Bennett.

Under the command of William Hingston (or Kingston), Hillsborough sailed from Gravesend via Portland Roads, England, on 23 December 1798, and arrived at Port Jackson on 26 July 1799. She had left with 300 male convicts, but 95 died of yellow fever and dysentery on the voyage, and six more shortly after landing. This high death toll gave rise to Hillsborough becoming known as the "fever ship". Governor Hunter wrote a letter to the Secretary of the Colonies:

The Hillsborough has just arrived with a cargo of the most miserable and wretched convicts I ever beheld. Were you, my dear Sir, in the situation in which I stand, I am convinced all the feelings of humanity, every sensation which can occasion a pang for the distresses of a fellow creature, would be seen to operate in you with full force.

While at Port Jackson Hillsborough received a new master, Captain Robert Rhodes, who had come out to New South Wales as mate on Hillsborough. (Note: Hingston had left Hillsborough at Port Jackson, becoming part-owner of Hunter, which would depart shortly after Hillsborough. Hunter, with Hingston as master, left Port Jackson on 7 October, sailing first to New Zealand to pick up spars, and then sailing on to Bengal. Hunter had been the Spanish merchantman Nostra Senora de Bethlehem, which the whalers Cornwall and Kingston had captured at Cabo Blanco, Peru, and sent into Port Jackson where she had arrived on 24 April 1799.)

As Hillsborough was preparing to sail from Sydney Cove in October, a strict search found 30 stowaways aboard her. They were removed and punished. Two sailors who had aided the stowaways were also brought on shore and punished before being returned to Hillsborough. Rhodes then sailed for the south seas fisheries to engage in whaling. (Note: The newspaper listing of her arrival and departure at Port Jackson gives her departure date as 12 May 1810, but this is clearly incorrect.)

Hillsborough spent eight months sealing and whaling around the Kerguelen Islands, also known as the Desolation Islands. During this period Rhodes prepared a chart of the islands, and named a bay "Hillsborough Bay". Forty years later, James Clark Ross spent some months in the islands during his expedition to the Antarctic in Terror and Erebus. Ross found Rhodes's charts useful and so named a bay after Rhodes in tribute to him.

Hillsborough then returned from South Georgia. She reached Gravesend on 15 April 1801 with 450 tuns of oil.

Hillsborough again sailed for the South Seas on 11 August 1801. Daniel Bennett now shared her ownership with Charles Price, and her master was Captain Thomas Pittman (or Pitman). Pittman received a letter of marque on 17 July 1801, shortly before Hillsborough left England. Hillsborough was also listed on the Protection List, which exempted her crew from impressment. In 1802 she was valued at £11,000. Hillsborough returned from the South Seas on 20 March 1803.

Hillsborough apparently made one more voyage for Bennett and Price, this time to Peru. Cyrus reported that in October 1805 Hillsborough was near the Galapagos Islands with 60 barrels of oil and on her way to New Zealand.

== Fate ==
The volume of the Register of Shipping for 1804 carried the annotation that Hillsborough was broken up.
