= Cato (1800 ship) =

Shipwreck in Queensland, Australia

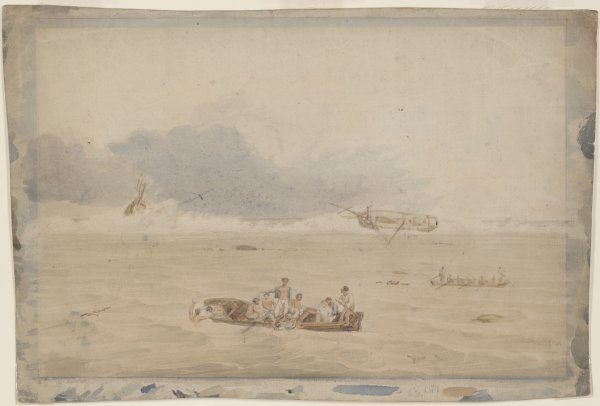
- Cato and HMS Porpoise

History

Great Britain
- Name: Cato
- Owner: Reeve & Green, London
- Builder: Thomas Haw, Stockton, England
- Launched: 2 December 1800
- Fate: Wrecked 17 August 1803.

General characteristics
- Class & type: Full-rigged ship
- Tons burthen: 430, or 43088/94, or 431(bm)
- Armament: 4 × 6-pounder + 6 × 9-pounder guns
- Notes: Copper sheathing (1801)

Cato was launched at Stockton in 1800, and registered in London to Reeve & Green. She was wrecked on the Great Barrier Reef, Australia in 1803, at (22°11′48″S 155°21′30″E).

== History ==
Cato first appears in Lloyd's Register in 1802, with C. Pearson, master, changing to I. Park, and trade London—Suriname. The Register of Shipping has a little more information; it also reports Cato's armament, and shows her trade changing to London—Botany Bay.

Cato, Park, master, arrived in Port Jackson, New South Wales, from England on 9 March 1803, carrying stores.

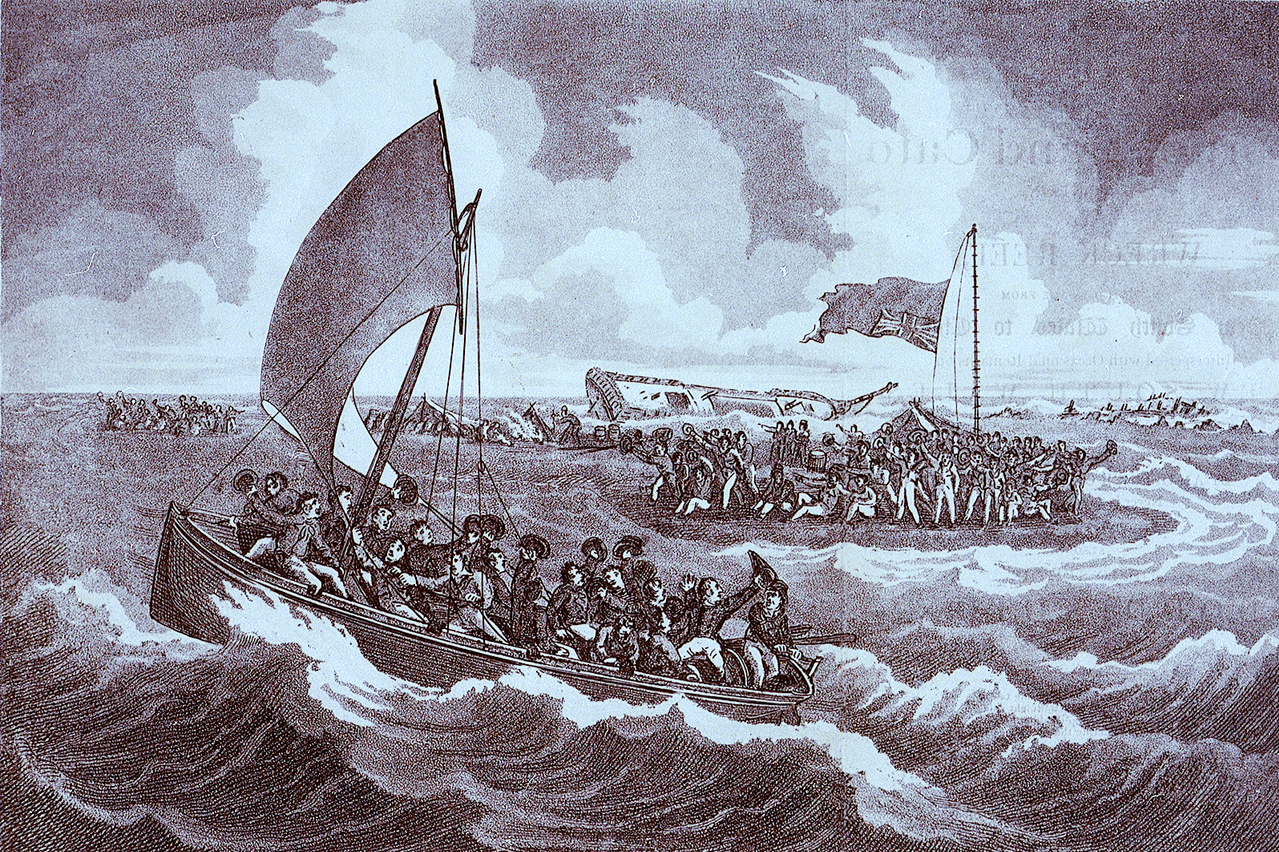
Crews of Porpoise and Cato evacuating their ships

On 10 August 1803, Cato left Sydney in the company of HMS Porpoise and Bridgewater, all bound for Canton. On 17 August, the three ships got caught near a sandbank, 157 miles north and 51 miles east of Sandy Cape. With shrinking leeway, both Cato and Porpoise grounded.

Bridgewater sailed on, despite knowing that the other two vessels had come to grief. The crew and passengers of the wrecked vessels were able to land on a sandbank as both their ships broke up.

On 26 August 1803, with no sign of rescue, Porpoise passenger Matthew Flinders and Captain John Park of Cato took the largest cutter (which they named Hope), and twelve crewmen and headed to Sydney to seek rescue. Through marvelous navigation, Hope made it to Port Jackson by 8 September. Although three lives had been lost in the joint shipwreck, Rolla, and the schooners HMS Cumberland and Francis, were able to rescue all the remaining passengers. Rolla then took the people she had rescued to Canton.

== Naming ==
This sandbank become known as Wreck Reefs and is located in the southern part of the Coral Sea Islands approximately 450 km (280 mi) East Nor East of Gladstone, Queensland or 250 km (155 mi) east of the Swain reefs complex. They form a narrow chain of reefs with small cays that extends for around 25 km (16 mi) in a west to east line. Cato also gave its name to the nearby Cato Reef, which it discovered.
