= Thomas Watling =

Australian artist (1762–1814)

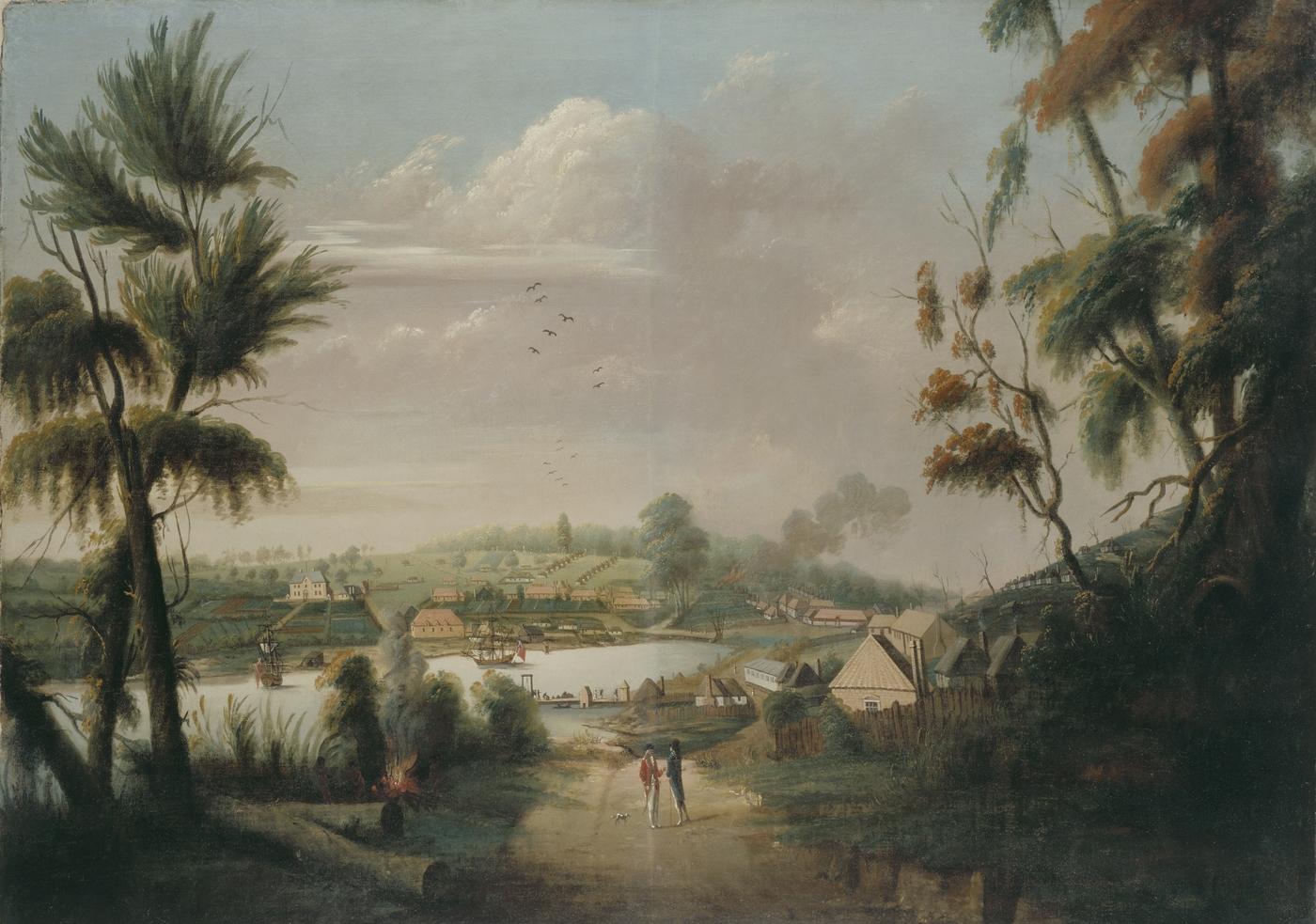
- A Direct North View of Sydney Cove, 1794 by Thomas Watling
- Born: 19 September 1762; Dumfries, Scotland
- Died: 1814?
- Occupations: Landscape and natural history artist, author and convict
- Father: Ham Watlin

Thomas Watling (19 September 1762 – 1814?), was an early Australian painter and illustrator, notable for his natural history drawings and landscapes.

== Early life and education ==
Born in Dumfries, Scotland, he was raised by his maiden aunt, Marion Kirkpatrick, after both parents died in his infancy. Art featured in his education and he went on to form his own “academy” where he taught drawing to "Ladies and Gentlemen". In Glasgow he worked briefly as a coach and chaise painter before being charged with forgery, in Dumfries on 27 November 1788.

== Conviction and transportation to New South Wales ==
Watling was charged with having forged 1 guinea promissory notes of the Bank of Scotland, and sentenced to fourteen years' transportation to New South Wales on 14 April 1789. He was held at Plymouth in the prison ship Dunkirk, before being transferred to the convict transport Pitt. Departing on the Pitt with 410 convicts in July 1791, Watling escaped while docked at Cape Town. He was later arrested and transferred to the East Indiaman Royal Admiral, finally arriving in Sydney on 7 October 1792.

== Career ==
=== Artist in New South Wales ===
Thomas Watling is thought to be the first professional artist to arrive in New South Wales.

In Sydney Watling worked with John White, the colony's Surgeon General, copying natural history illustrations. In 1796 he was given a conditional pardon by the colony's second governor, John Hunter, made absolute on 5 April 1797.

Thomas Watling painted many of the early colonial pictures of Australia and made a prolific number of sketches of birds, fish, mammals, plants, landscapes and Aboriginal people.

One painting that was attributed to him, A direct north general view of Sydney Cove 1794, is the earliest known oil painting of Sydney. The identity of the artist of this oil painting has long been debated. The inscription on the reverse clearly identifies Watling, however, he is not known to have painted in oils. The canvas is dated 1794 and there is no record of any colonial artist using oils until 1812, by which time Watling had received a pardon and returned to Britain. It is now believed this work was painted in Britain, possibly based on sketches made by Watling in Sydney. This work now belongs to the Dixson Gallery, State Library of New South Wales.

== See also ==
- List of convicts transported to Australia
- Visual arts of Australia
