= Tasmantid Seamount Chain =

Long chain of seamounts in the South Pacific Ocean

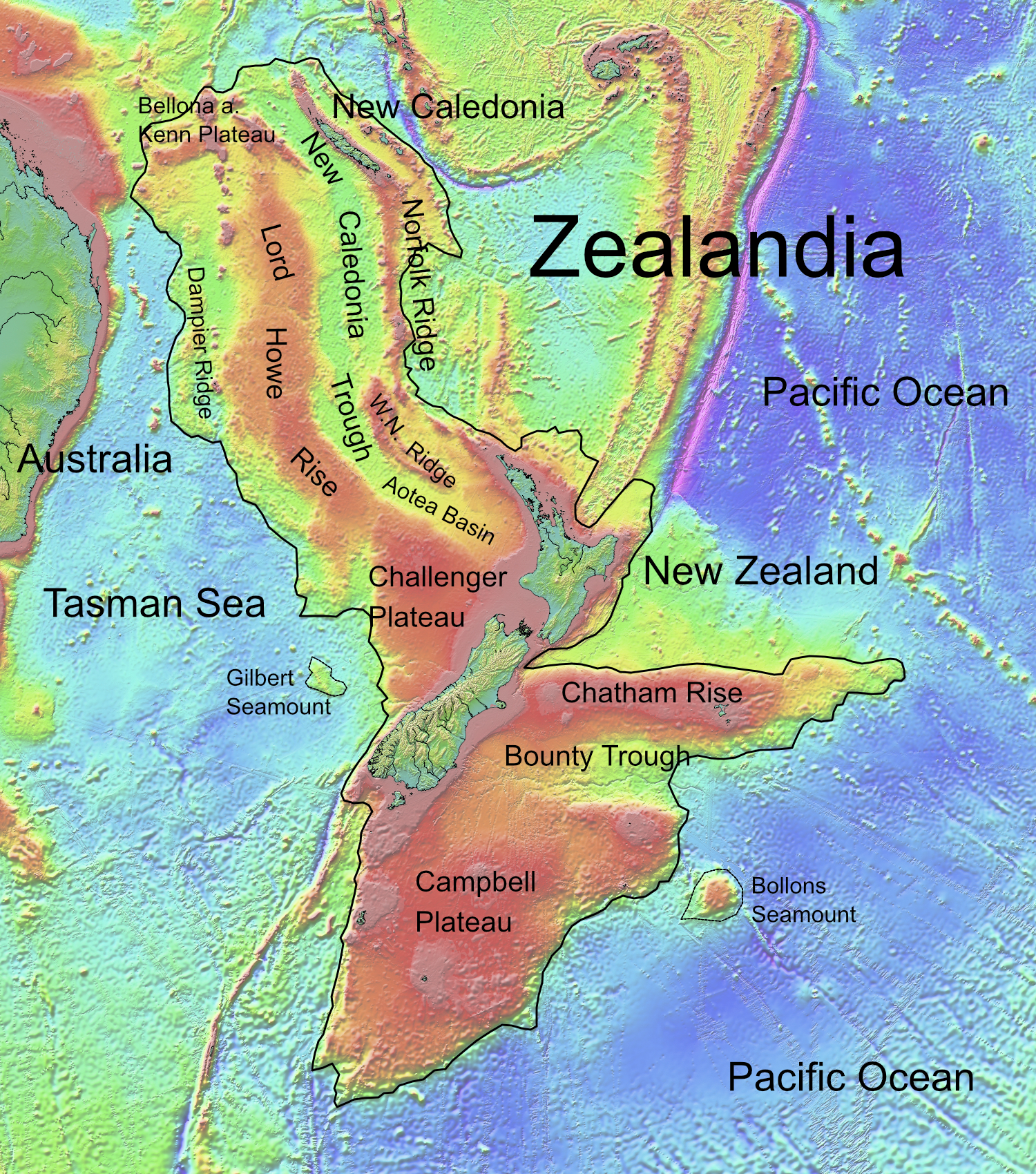
- Topographic map of Zealandia that includes the Tasmantid Seamount Chain (unlabelled, above the label Australia) off the east of Australia extending from the Coral Sea southwards into the Tasman Sea.
- Named seamounts in Tasmantid Seamount Chain (red - coral reefs, yellow - seamounts)

Location
- Location: Coral and Tasman seas
- Coordinates: 31°00′S 156°00′E

Geology
- Type: Seamount chain
- Age of rock: 56–7 Ma

The Tasmantid Seamount Chain (alternatively Tasmantid Seamounts, Tasman Seamounts, Tasman Seamount Chain, Tasmantide Volcanoes or the Tasmantids) is a 2,000 km (1,200 mi) long chain of seamounts in the South Pacific Ocean. The chain consists of over 16 extinct volcanic peaks, many rising more than 4,000 m (13,000 ft) from the seabed.< It is one of the two parallel seamount chains alongside the East Coast of Australia; the Lord Howe and Tasmantid seamount chains both run north–south through parts of the Coral Sea and Tasman Sea. These chains have longitudes of approximately 159°E and 156°E respectively.

Like its neighbour, the Tasmantid Seamount Chain has resulted from the Indo-Australian Plate moving northward over a stationary hotspot. It ranges in age from about 56 to 7 million years old.

== Features ==
The Tasmantid Seamount Chain includes the following named seamounts:

Tasmantid Seamounts
Seamount	Location	Age (Note: Only limited sampling and age studies have been done. Ages are available on some of the eleven dredging samples analysed by Eggins et al.(1991) by K/Ar absolute methodology and some of 32 later samples by the ^{40}Ar^{39}Ar relative methodology. While different specimens from Gascoyne Seamount matched on age, different specimens from Britannia Guyots mismatch by 5 million years odd by the two different methodologies. However adjacent volcanoes can have long eruptive histories. ^{40}Ar^{39}Ar age subsample data as presented in conference proceedings in 2015 is sourced from the appendix published by Douglas(2022).)	Notes
Gascoyne Seamount	36°41′00″S 156°07′00″E	7.13 ± 0.07 Ma	
Kimbla Seamount	35°06′37″S 156°28′32″E		
Taupo Bank	33°10′00″S 156°10′00″E	10.3 to 11.4 Ma	
Barcoo Bank	32°35′00″S 156°15′00″E		
Derwent Hunter Guyot	30°52′00″S 156°11′00″E	16.83 ± 0.1 Ma	
Stradbroke Seamount	29°05′00″S 155°45′00″E		
Britannia Guyots	28°17′00″S 155°38′00″E	17.6 to 23 Ma	North, Central and South Seamounts Central Britannia 23.0± 0.2 Ma, South Britannia age 21.68 ± 0.17 Ma
Queensland Guyot	27°35′00″S 155°11′00″E	20.9 Ma	
Brisbane Guyots	26°59′00″S 155°05′00″E	27.28 ± 0.15	Age is North Brisbane North and South Brisbane Seamounts
Mooloolaba Seamount	26°20′S 154°52′E		
Moreton Seamounts	26°01′00″S 154°58′00″E		North and South Moreton
Recorder Guyots	25°10′00″S 154°55′00″E	26.4 to 30.0 Ma	North Recorder is younger Named from the British cable ship "Recorder" North and South Recorder Seamounts
Fraser Seamounts	24°26′00″S 155°17′00″E	26.4 ± 0.2 Ma	Age South Frazer North and South Fraser Not to be confused with Fraser Island.
Cato Reef	23°13′S 155°34′E	31.25 ± 0.16 Ma	Coral reef
Wreck Reefs	22°11′S 155°20′E	31.7 to 32.9 Ma	Coral reef
Kenn Reef	21°12′S 155°43′E		Coral reef
Mellish Reef	17°25′00″S 155°50′00″E		Most northern coral reef of seamount chain

There is an unnamed seamount between Stradbroke Seamount and Derwent Hunter Guyot and seven unnamed seamounts in the Coral Sea near Mellish Reef that have been assigned to the chain. Some of the later have age ranges between 37.0 and 50.5 Ma. Also assigned to the chain are two sampled areas of the southern Louisiade Plateau with ages of 56.40 ± 0.60 and 55.00 ± 0.40 Ma respectively that are believed to represent the most northern aspects of the chain.

== Geology ==
The volcanics are saturated tholeiitic to transitional alkali-olivine basalt.
