= Swain Reefs National Park =

National park in Australia

- IUCN category II (national park)
- Location within Queensland
- Location: Queensland
- Coordinates: 21°14′22″S 151°50′48″E
- Area: 0.58 km^{2} (0.22 sq mi)
- Established: 1995
- Governing body: Queensland Parks and Wildlife Service

Swain Reefs is a national park in North Queensland, Australia, 703 km (437 miles) north of Brisbane. It was established in 1995, and covers an area of 0.58 km^{2}. It is managed by the Queensland Parks and Wildlife Service.

== Fauna ==
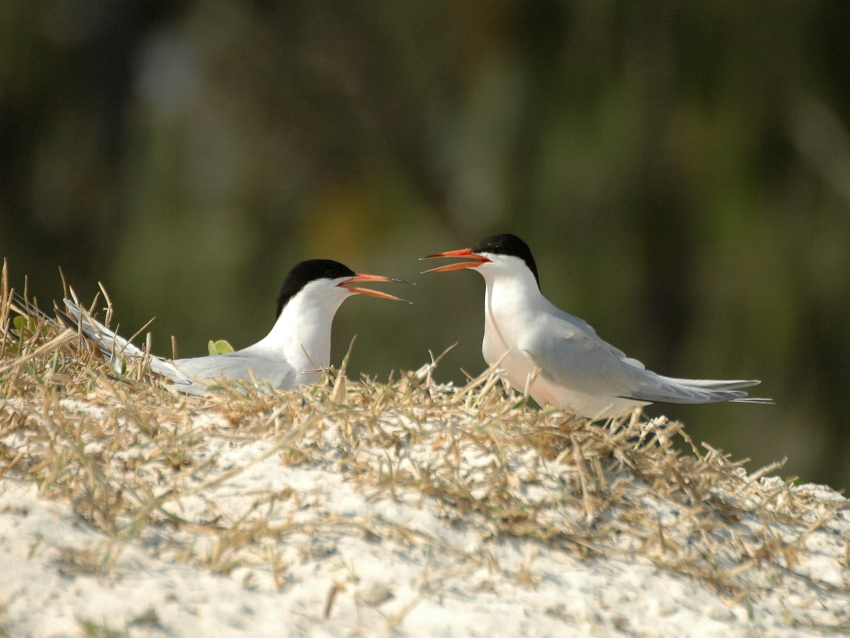
The IBA is an important area for roseate terns

=== Birds ===
Nine small cays, with a combined area of 9 ha (22 acres), comprise the Swain Reefs Important Bird Area (IBA), identified as such by BirdLife International because together they support over 1% of the world population of breeding roseate terns, and even larger numbers of non-breeding roseate terns, with up to 25,000 individuals recorded there. Other birds recorded on the cays include masked and brown boobies, silver gulls, black-naped, sooty, bridled, greater crested, lesser crested and little terns, black and common noddies, and lesser frigatebirds. Cays supporting seabirds include Gannet Cay (1.7 ha (4.2 acres)), Bylund Cay (0.6 ha (1.5 acres)), Thomas Cay (1 ha (2.5 acres)), Bacchi Cay (0.5 ha (1.2 acres)), Frigate Cay (2 ha (4.9 acres)), Price Cay (1.6 ha (4.0 acres)), Distant Cay (0.25 ha (0.62 acres)), Riptide Cay (0.25 ha (0.62 acres)) and Bell Cay (1.5 ha (3.7 acres)).

=== Fish ===
The rockcod (Epinephelus fuscomarginatus), which is popular in Australian cuisine, occurs here at depths of about 220 m (720 ft).

== See also ==
- Protected areas of Queensland
