= Royal Admiral (1777 ship) =

History

East India Company
- Name: Royal Admiral
- Owner: Voyages 1-4: Sir Richard Hotham; Voyages 5-6: Thomas Larkins; Voyages 7-8: John Pascall Larkins
- Operator: East India Company (1777-1798)
- Builder: William Barnard, Deptford
- Launched: 1777
- Fate: Sold c. 1798
- Notes: Three decks; almost rebuilt 1794

United Kingdom
- Name: Royal Admiral
- Owner: Gillet & Co.
- Acquired: c. 1798
- Fate: Disappears from the records in 1807

General characteristics
- Tons burthen: 914, or 919 or 923, (bm)
- Length: 120 ft 2 in (36.6 m)
- Beam: 37 ft 10 in (11.5 m)
- Complement: First letter of marque: 99; Second letter of marque: 80; Third letter of marque: 76
- Armament: First letter of marque: 26 × 9- & 6-pounder guns + 2 × 12-pounder carronades; Second letter of marque: 26 × 9- & 6-pounder guns; Third letter of marque: 24 × 9- & 6-pounder guns

Royal Admiral was an East Indiaman, launched in 1777 on the River Thames. She made eight trips for the East India Company (EIC) before she was sold. She then continued to trade. She made two trips carrying convicts from England to Australia, one as an East Indiaman in 1791, and a second in 1800. On this second voyage as a convict transport she was present at a notable naval action.

== East Indiaman ==
Royal Admiral made eight voyages for the EIC.

=== Voyage #1 (1778-90) ===
On her first voyage, Captain Joseph Huddart sailed her from Portsmouth on 27 April 1778. She reached Madeira on 27 May, the Cape of Good Hope (Cape) on 24 August, Anjengo in January 1779, and finally Bombay on 7 February. On the return trip she was back at Madeira on 21 August, and in the Downs on 13 January 1780.

=== Voyage #2 (1780-83) ===
Huddart and Royal Admiral left Portsmouth on 3 June 1780. She reached Rio de Janeiro on 28 August, Anjengo on 16 January 1781, Goa on 29 January, and Bombay on 14 February. She then spent months on the coasts of India and in the Indian Ocean. On 8 May she was at Tellicherry, then on 26 May Cuddalore, and on 4 June Negapatam. From there she went to Madras, arriving on 26 June, 'Jaggernaickpuram' on 18 July, Masulipatam on 7 August, and returning to Madras on 28 August. She was again at Negapatam on 12 October, and Anjengo on 9 December, Tellicherry on 15 December, Bombay on 31 December, Tellicherry again on 30 April 1782, and Bombay for the last time on this voyage on 28 May. From there she reached St Helena on 31 January 1783 and the Downs on 25 August.

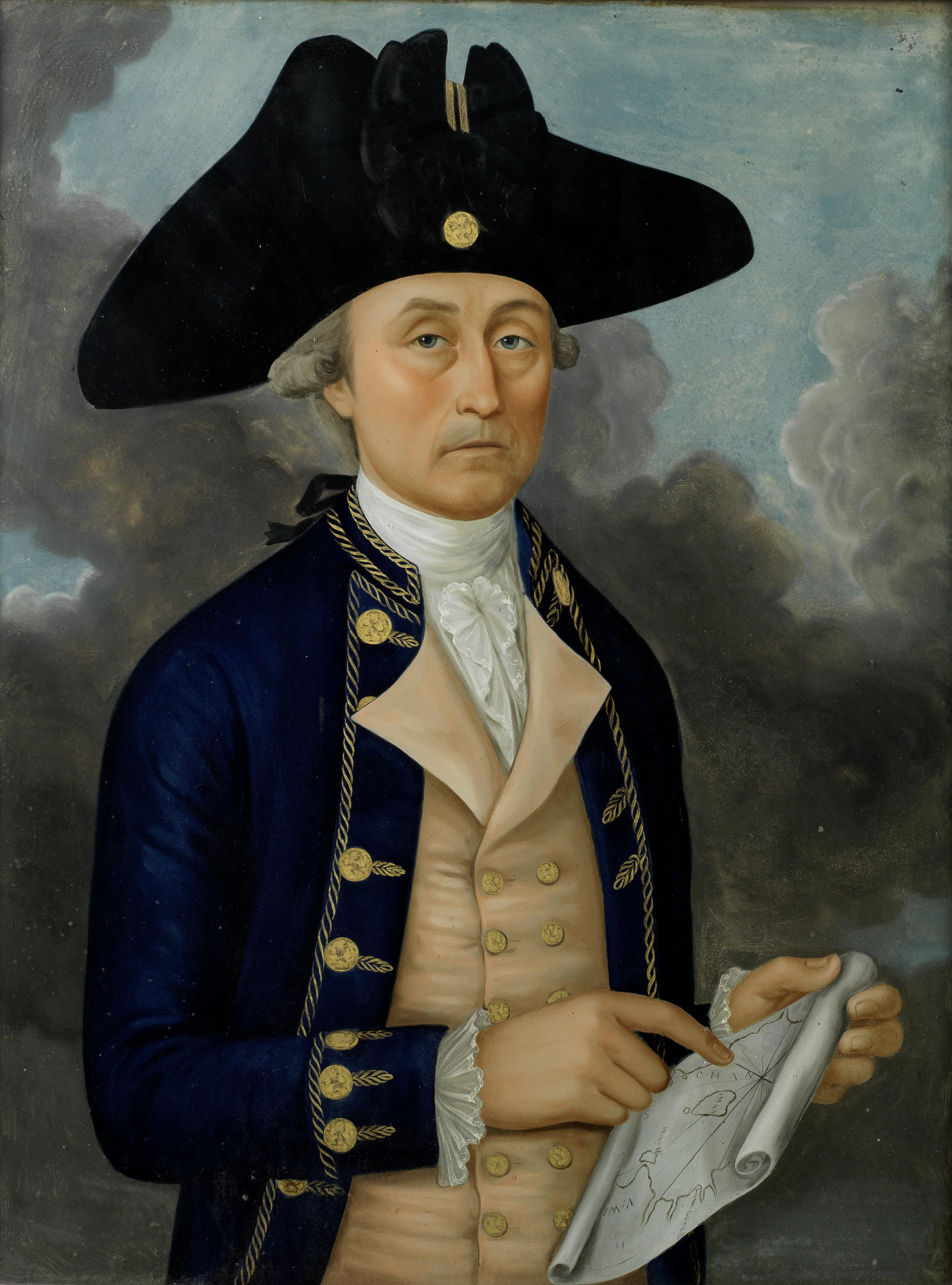
Capt. Joseph Huddart, in a Chinese reverse glass painting from c. 1785–9.

=== Voyage #3 (1784-86) ===
Huddart left the Downs on 26 March 1784, reaching St Helena on 8 June, and Bombay on 19 September. From Bombay Royal Admiral sailed to Tellicherry, arriving 25 November, and to Anjengo, arriving on 9 December, before returning to Bombay, which she reached on 29 December. She then sailed to China via Malacca, which she reached on 13 June 1785, before arriving on 8 July at Whampoa. For her return to Britain she crossed Second Bar on 18 October, reached St Helena on 17 February 1786, and the Downs on 27 April.

=== Voyage #4 (1787-88) ===
Huddart sailed Royal Admiral from the Downs on 20 January 1787. She reached Trindade on 12 March, and Madras on 22 May. Her next stop, on 27 July, was Penang. From there she arrived at Whampoa on 21 September. For her return to Britain she crossed Second Bar 18 January 1788, reached St Helena on 2 May, and arrived at the Downs on 3 July.

=== Voyage #5 (1790-91) ===
Captain Essex Henry Bond took command of Royal Admiral for her next three voyages. She left the Downs on 17 April 1790 and arrived at Whampoa on 26 August. She crossed Second Bar on 31 January 1791, reached the Cape on 9 April, St Helena seventeen days later, and the Downs on 26 June.

=== Voyage #6 (1792-93) ===
Again under Bond's command, she sailed from Torbay, England, on 30 May 1792, with 299 male and 49 female convicts. She reached the Cape on 9 August. One male convict escaped at the Cape, but one convict escapee from the Pitt, the convicted forger and future Australian artist Thomas Watling, was transported on board after the Dutch had recaptured him. Royal Admiral arrived in Port Jackson, New South Wales on 7 October 1792. Ten male and two female convicts had died during the voyage; four children were born.

Royal Admiral left Port Jackson on 13 November, bound for China. (Note: One source gives her departure year as 1796, but this is clearly an error, given that the source correctly reports her arrival in 1792.) After leaving Port Jackson Royal Admiral arrived at Whampoa on 14 January 1793. On the return trip to Britain she reached Bocca Tigris on 18 March and St Helena on 16 June, and arrived at the Downs on 21 August.

=== Voyage #7 (1794-95) ===
Royal Admiral was almost rebuilt in 1794. Her next voyage, the seventh, began during the French Revolutionary War, and as was standard practice for the EIC, on 13 June 1794 Bond received a letter of marque. Royal Admiral left Plymouth on 14 August. She reached Madeira on 5 September, the Cape on 28 November, and Diamond Harbour on 20 February 1795. On her homeward bound leg she reached Saugor on 26 April, Madras on 18 July, Trincomalee on 12 August, St Helena on 7 November, and the Downs on 16 March 1796.

=== Voyage #8 (1796-98) ===
Captain William Dorset Fellowes commanded Royal Admiral on her eighth voyage, and received a letter of marque on 8 June 1796. She left Portsmouth on 11 August 1796 and reached the Cape on 18 November. She arrived at Kedgeree on 28 February 1797 and Diamond Harbour on 21 March. On 1 July she was again at Kedgeree, on 21 July at Ganjam, on 9 August at Madras, on 8 October at Diamond Harbour, and on 14 October at Calcutta.

The reason for the to-and-fro, was that the British government planned to mount an expedition against Manila in 1797–8. (One of the Royal Navy vessels involved appears to have been HMS Sybille.) The EIC held eight regular ships and three "dismantled ships" to support the expedition: Pitt, Lascalles, and Royal Admiral. None of the three went to Penang, but instead went to the Coromandel Coast with stores and back to Bengal. A peace treaty with Spain resulted in the British cancelling the expedition.

The EIC detained Pitt and Royal Admiral for an average of a year, though Pitt appears to have spent less time than that. The owners claimed demurrage; for Royal Admiral, the amount they claimed was £8,568 15s for 250 days.

The captains involved sued the EIC for expenses, though Fellowes did not. The court further ordered that the officers of the vessels involved receive some payment. Royal Admiral''s officers received £200 in all, with Fellowes receiving £40, her purser £16, and the other officers intermediate amounts. Fellowes received by far the smallest amount of any of the 11 captains involved.

For her return to Britain, Royal Admiral reached Saugor on 27 January 1798, the Cape on 28 May, St Helena on 29 June, and the Downs on 18 October.

In 1799 her owners sold Royal Admiral to Gillett & Co., of Calcutta. Gillett and Co. wanted her for the local trade in India.

== Botany Bay ship ==
Royal Admiral first appears in the Lloyd's Register for 1800 with William Wilson as captain and Gillet & Co. as owners, destination Botany Bay, and her age is given as 23 years old. She appears among the list of vessels sailing for the EIC, but as a separate listing from the above. She also does not appear in the Hardy & Hardy (1811) list of vessels serving the EIC between 1760 and 1810, indicating that the EIC had sold her.

She sailed from Portsmouth on 23 May 1800, under a letter of marque issued to Wilson on 10 February 1800. She was carrying 300 male convicts. She was also carrying 11 missionaries and had undertaken to deliver them to the South Sea islands after having delivered her convicts.

She was one of the vessels in the convoy at the action of 4 August 1800, when HMS Belliqueux and the East Indiaman Exeter captured the French frigates Concorde and Médée.

Royal Admiral arrived at Rio on 12 August. Lloyd's List reported in January 1801 that the Botany Bay ship Royal Admiral had been at Rio de Janeiro, having sailed in company with several ships of the East India Company. On the way, 23 prisoners, her surgeon Samuel Turner, four seamen, a convict's wife, and a convict's child had died.

Royal Admiral reached Port Jackson, New South Wales, on 20 November. Forty-three male convicts had died during the voyage.

She left Port Jackson on 23 March, bound for China. She reached the Barrier Islands on 21 April and left them on 17 June, reaching Tahiti on 10 July. From there she sailed on 2 August, the reaching Whampoa on 23 August. For her return to Britain, she crossed Second Bar on 22 December, reaching the Cape on 30 March 1802. She stopped at St Helena on 30 April, and arrived at the Downs on 2 July.

Royal Admiral last appears in Lloyd's Register in 1807, still with Wilson as captain, Gillet & Co. as owner, and London-Botany Bay as her destinations.
