= Central Eastern Marine Park =

Offshore protected area in New South Wales, Australia

- IUCN category IV (habitat/species management area)
- Map showing the Central Eastern Marine Park. The shaded area is a National Park Zone ('no take' zone).
- Location: Australia
- Coordinates: 30.4037°S 155.0500°E
- Area: 70,054 km^{2} (27,048 sq mi)
- Established: 1 July 2018
- Operator: Parks Australia
- Website: https://parksaustralia.gov.au/marine/parks/temperate-east

The Central Eastern Marine Park (formerly known as the Central Eastern Commonwealth Marine Reserve) is an Australian marine park that extends from the edge of the continental shelf, offshore of New South Wales and 30 km (19 mi) from Coffs Harbour, to about 200 km (120 mi) offshore into deep ocean waters. It incorporates the waters above most of the southern portion of the Tasmantid Seamount Chain. The marine park covers an area of 70,054 km^{2} (27,048 sq mi) and is assigned IUCN category IV. It is one of 8 parks managed under the Temperate East Marine Parks Network.

== Conservation values ==
=== Species and habitat ===
- Biologically important areas for the protected humpback whale, vulnerable white shark and a number of migratory seabirds.
- Represents seafloor features including: abyssal plain/deep ocean floor, canyon, pinnacle, slope, knoll/abyssal-hills/hills/mountains/peak, and seamount/guyot.

=== Bioregions and ecology ===
- Examples of the ecosystems of the Central Eastern Province, Central Eastern Shelf Transition, and Tasman Basin Province provincial bioregions and the Tweed-Moreton meso-scale bioregion.
- Canyons on the eastern continental slope (part of one of three shelf-incising canyons occurring in the region is represented).
- Tasmantid Seamount Chain (known breeding and feeding areas for a number of open ocean species such as billfish and marine mammals).

== History ==
The marine park was proclaimed under the EPBC Act on 14 December 2013 and renamed Central Eastern Marine Park on 9 October 2017. The management plan and protection measures of the marine park came into effect for the first time on 1 July 2018.

== Summary of protection zones ==
The Central Eastern Marine Park has been assigned IUCN protected area category IV. However, within the marine park there are three protection zones, each zone has an IUCN category and related rules for managing activities to ensure the protection of marine habitats and species.

The following table is a summary of the zoning rules within the Central Eastern Marine Park:

Zone	IUCN	Activities permitted						Total area (km^{2})
Zone	IUCN	Vessel transiting	Recreational fishing	Commercial fishing	Commercial aquaculture	Commercial tourism	Mining	Total area (km^{2})
National Park	II	Yes	No	No	No	excludes fishing, with approval	No	8,110
Habitat Protection	IV	Yes	Yes	some, with approval	with approval	with approval	No	61,336
Multiple Use	VI	Yes	Yes	most, with approval	with approval	with approval	with approval	608
External link: Zoning and rules for the Temperate East Marine Parks Network

== See also ==
- Protected areas managed by the Australian government
