= Tasmantid hotspot =

- Seamount ages from Tasmantid hotspot origin
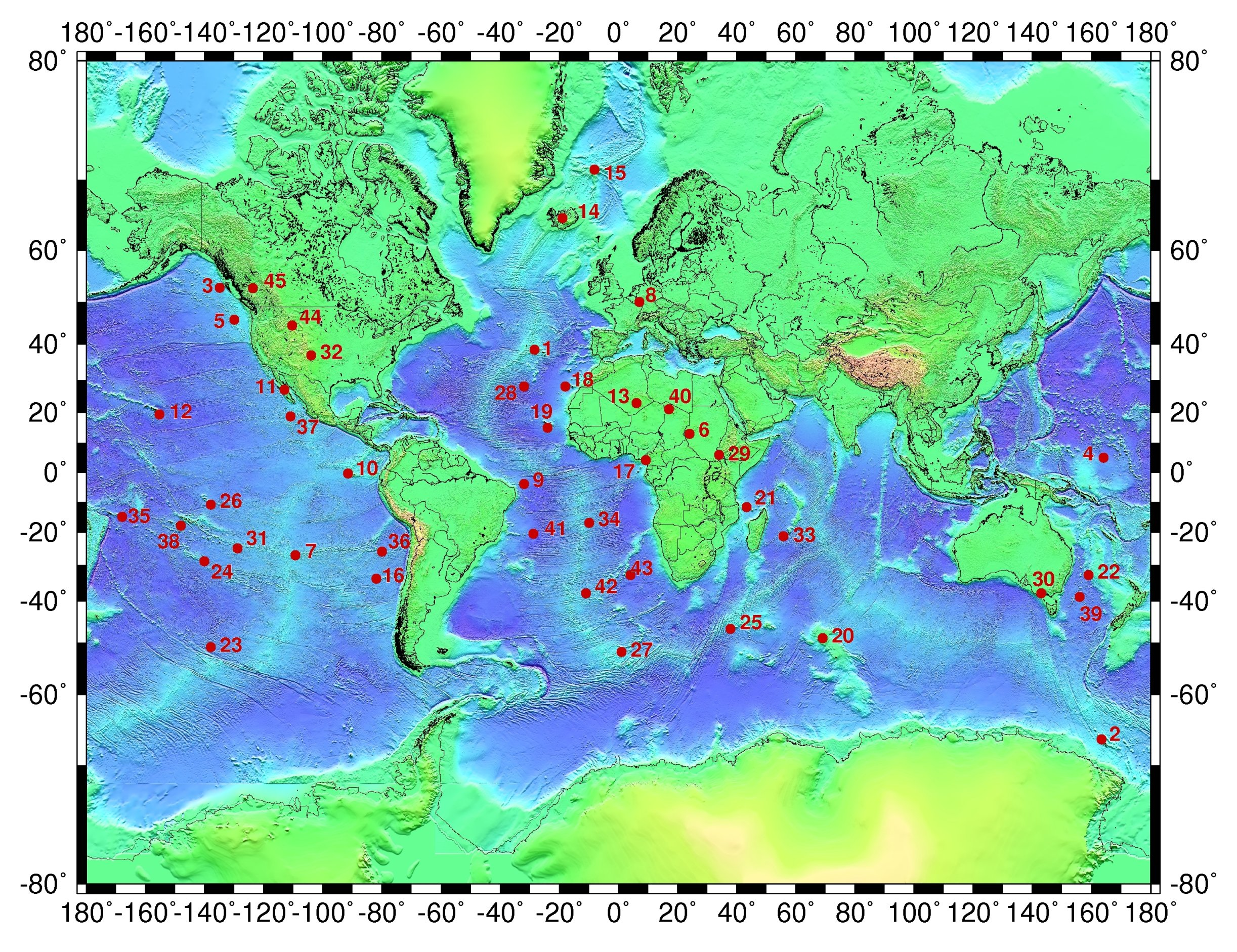
- The Tasmantid hotspot is marked 39 on map
- Region: South Pacific Ocean
- Coordinates: 40.24°S 155.30°E

The Tasmantid hotspot is a volcanic hotspot located in the South Pacific Ocean. The northward movement of the Indo-Australian Plate over the last 60 million years coupled with volcanism of the Tasmantid hotspot has resulted in a north–south line of submarine volcanoes called the Tasmantid Seamount Chain. This includes over 10 seamounts, the youngest of which is the seven million year old Gascoyne Seamount. The Tasmantid hotspot is now 400 km (250 mi) south of Gascoyne Seamount and is defined by a prominent zone of seismic activity.

Due to plate tectonics the hotspot was under different parts of the seabed in the past. It was initially centred under what is now the southern Coral Sea about 60 million years ago somewhere close to where the present Louisiade Plateau is located, so it has been suggested that the Louisiade Plateau might be a large igneous province created by the hotspot. At the southern boundary of the plateau are volcanic rocks that appear in age and type to be able to be assigned to a Tasmantid volcano. As the Indo-Australian Plate continued to drift northwards the hotspot became positioned in the northern Tasman Sea 20 million years ago, eventually reaching its current location east of Tasmania in response to ongoing northward plate motion.

The erupted volcanics are saturated tholeiitic to transitional alkali olivine basalt.

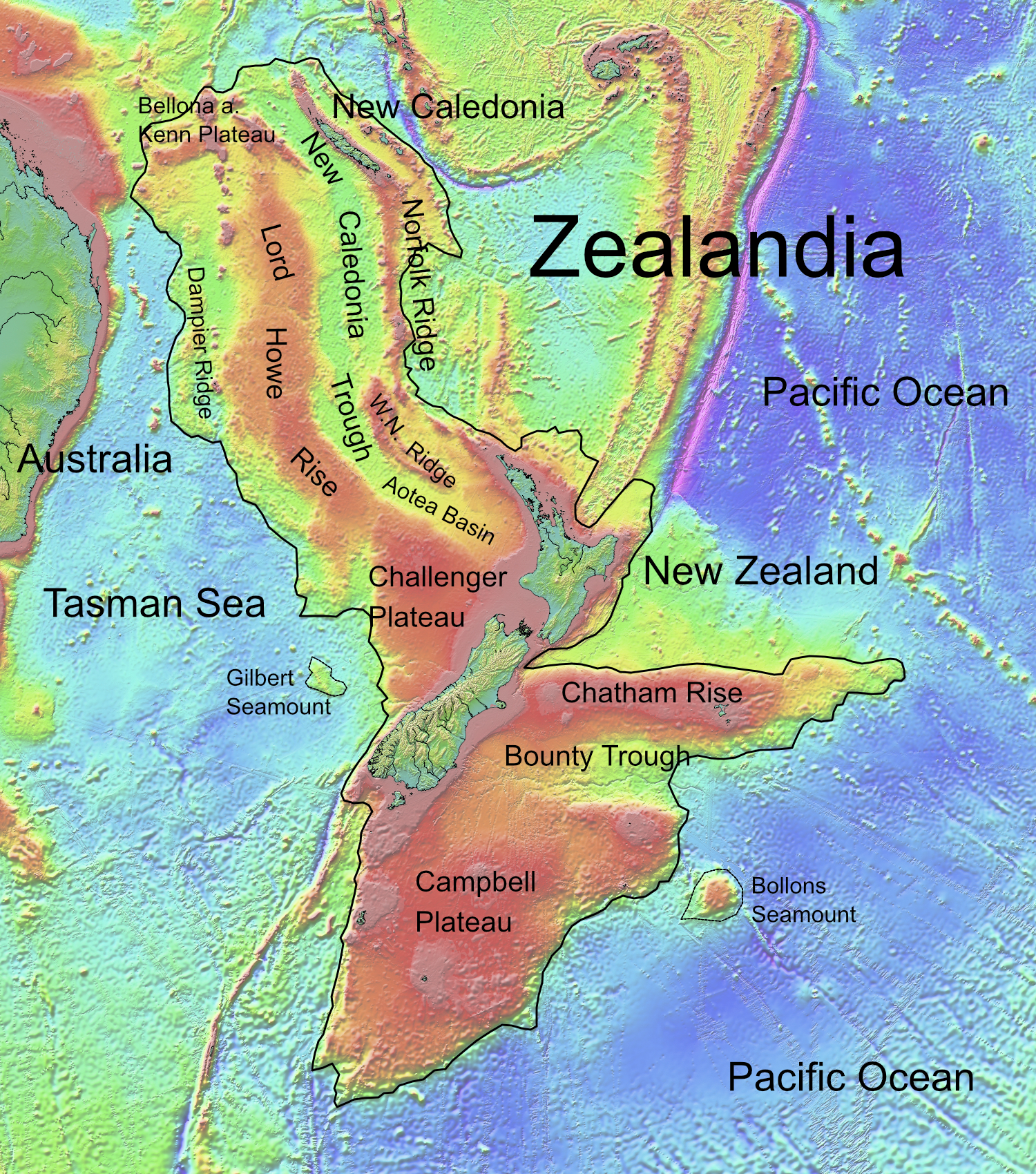
Topographic map of Zealandia that includes the line of submerged volcanos to the east of the Australian coast that resulted from the activity of the Tasmantid hotspot . The current location of the Tasmantid hotspot is just below the word Tasman of the label on the map of the Tasman Sea.
