= Elizabeth and Middleton Reefs Marine National Park Reserve =

Coordinates: 29.95969°S 159.07654°E

Designations

Ramsar Wetland
- Official name: Elizabeth and Middleton Reefs Marine National Nature Reserve
- Designated: 21 October 2002
- Reference no.: 1223

Elizabeth Reef image from NASA Millennium Coral Reef Mapping Project

Middleton Reef image from NASA Millennium Coral Reef Mapping Project

Elizabeth and Middleton Reefs Marine National Park Reserve is a former marine protected area consisting of waters around Elizabeth and Middleton reefs located at the south-eastern end of the Coral Sea Islands, an Australian territory in the Coral Sea. It was incorporated into the new Lord Howe Commonwealth Marine Reserve in December 2012. The two reefs also form a Ramsar site, having been listed as Ramsar Site 1223, on 21 October 2002, under the Ramsar Convention as a wetland of international importance.

== Description ==
Elizabeth Reef and Middleton Reef are a pair of isolated oceanic platform reefs separated from one another by 45 km of deep oceanic waters. They are located in the Coral Sea, around 175 km north from Lord Howe Island and 555 km off the New South Wales coast, due east from Coffs Harbour. They are unique in that they represent the southernmost platform reefs in the world.

The two reefs of are of similar size and shape. They are largely awash, with only two small sand cays, one at each reef, being emergent at high tide. The reefs sit atop a feature known as the Lord Howe Rise — a ridge of volcanic origins that runs from New Zealand northwest across the Tasman Sea. Nearby Lord Howe Island is the only other emergent part of the ridge.

Despite their high latitude both reefs display a rich and diverse marine flora and fauna, brought about by their location in an area where tropical and temperate ocean currents meet. Some 314 fishes of 174 genera and 75 families have been recorded from the site, many more than at other Tasman Sea islands.

As well as their considerable natural values, a large number of shipwrecks gives the area considerable marine archaeological significance. They are protected by the Elizabeth and Middleton Reefs Marine National Nature Reserve, covering 1,880 km^{2}. The reserve was proclaimed in 1987 to protect the two reefs' important and fragile marine ecosystems, as well as with the aim of conserving the rare and endangered Black Cod (Epinephelus daemelli).

=== Elizabeth Reef ===
Elizabeth Reef at 8.2 km by 5.5 km is slightly smaller than Middleton. Its cay, Elizabeth Island, measures about 400 m in length and is up to 400 m in width. At low tides much of the reef flat is exposed by the receding waters.

=== Middleton Reef ===
Middleton Reef is a kidney-shaped structure, 8.9 km by 6.3 km. On the north side is an entrance into the interior lagoon which is protected by the hard algal ridge and extensive reef flat that forms the outer margin to the reef. Its cay, known as The Sound, measures 100 m by 70 m. Its shallow lagoon has a sandy to silty bottom that contains numerous patch reefs and areas of coral pavement.
