= SS Runic (1949) =

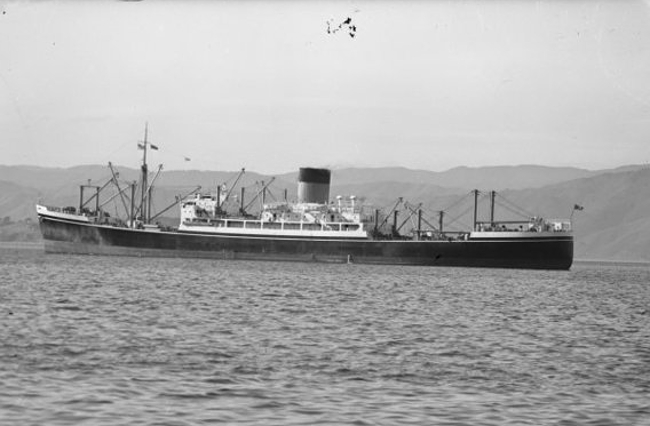
- Runic in 1951

History

United Kingdom
- Name: Runic
- Owner: Shaw, Savill and Albion Line
- Builder: Harland and Wolff shipyard, Belfast
- Yard number: 1414
- Launched: 21 October 1949
- Completed: 24 March 1950
- Out of service: 19 February 1961
- Fate: Wrecked in 1961

General characteristics
- Type: Refrigerated cargo ship
- Tonnage: 13,587 GRT
- Length: 561 ft (171 m)
- Beam: 72.2 ft (22.0 m)
- Decks: three
- Installed power: reduction geared steam turbines
- Propulsion: Two propellers
- Speed: 17 knots (31 km/h; 20 mph) service speed
- Crew: 69

SS Runic was a refrigerated cargo ship built at Harland and Wolff, Belfast in 1949 for the Shaw, Savill & Albion Line. She was launched at Belfast in October 1949, and entered service in March 1950, and was designed for trade between the United Kingdom, Australia and New Zealand. She had two sister ships; Persic and Suevic.

Like many Shaw, Savill ships, Runic took its name from an earlier White Star Line ship of the same name.

== Description ==
Runic had a gross register tonnage (GRT) of 13,587 tons, and a deadweight tonnage of 14,500 tons, and measured 561 ft (171 m) long by 72.2 ft (22.0 m) wide. She was powered by reduction geared steam turbines through two propellers, and had a service speed of 17 knots (31 km/h; 20 mph).

== Loss ==
On 19 February 1961 while en route from Brisbane to New Zealand, Runic ran aground on Middleton Reef in the Tasman Sea after sailing through the tail end of a hurricane, despite attempts at salvage, bad weather pushed the ship further onto the reef and it started to flood. On 22 March salvage efforts were abandoned and Runic was declared a constructive total loss, her crew of 69 was evacuated onto the Shaw, Savill ship Arabic and taken to Sydney.

In 2012, the wreck was still partially intact.
