= Lord Howe Marine Park =

Australian marine park offshore of New South Wales, near Lord Howe Island

- IUCN category IV (habitat/species management area)
- Map showing the Lord Howe Marine Park. The shaded areas are National Park Zones ('no take' zones).
- Location: Australia
- Coordinates: 32.059°S 159.056°E
- Area: 110,126 km^{2} (42,520 sq mi)
- Established: 1 July 2018
- Operator: Parks Australia
- Website: https://parksaustralia.gov.au/marine/parks/temperate-east

The Lord Howe Marine Park (formerly known as the Lord Howe Commonwealth Marine Reserve) is an Australian marine park located about 550 km (340 mi) offshore of New South Wales, near Lord Howe Island. The marine park covers an area of 110,126 km^{2} (42,520 sq mi), encompassing the smaller Lord Howe Island Marine Park, and is assigned IUCN category IV. It is one of 8 parks managed under the Temperate East Marine Parks Network.

== Conservation values ==
=== Species and habitat ===
- Biologically important areas for protected humpback whales and a number of migratory seabirds.
- A major seabird breeding area, with 14 species found on the islands including masked boobies, grey ternlets, red-tailed tropicbirds, black-winged petrels and Kermadec petrels
- Key location for black cod
- Due to the convergence of warmer northern tropical and cooler southern temperate waters in the area, many species found in the reserve are at the northern or southern extent of their range.

=== Bioregions and ecology ===
- Examples of the ecosystems of the Lord Howe Province and the Tasman Basin Province provincial bioregion.
- Represents seafloor features including: basin, plateau, saddle, seamount/guyot and deep ocean valley
- Lord Howe seamount chain, Elizabeth Reef, Middleton Reef and the Tasman Front and eddy field (areas of high productivity; aggregations of marine life; biodiversity and endemism).

== History ==
The marine park was proclaimed under the EPBC Act on 14 December 2013 and renamed Lord Howe Marine Park on 9 October 2017. The management plan and protection measures of the marine park came into effect for the first time on 1 July 2018.

=== Former reserves ===
The Lord Howe Marine Park includes areas of the former Lord Howe Island Marine Park (Commonwealth waters) (proclaimed 2000) and Elizabeth and Middleton Reefs Marine National Nature Reserve (proclaimed 1987).

== Summary of protection zones ==
The Lord Howe Marine Park has been assigned IUCN protected area category IV. However, within the marine park there are five protection zones, each zone has an IUCN category and related rules for managing activities to ensure the protection of marine habitats and species.

The following table is a summary of the zoning rules within the Lord Howe Marine Park:

Zone	IUCN	Activities permitted						Total area (km^{2})
Zone	IUCN	Vessel transiting	Recreational fishing	Commercial fishing	Commercial aquaculture	Commercial tourism	Mining	Total area (km^{2})
National Park	II	Yes	No	No	No	excludes fishing, with approval	No	9,273
Recreational Use	II	Yes	Yes	No	No	excludes fishing, with approval	No	1,170
Habitat Protection (Lord Howe)	IV	Yes	Yes	dropline and minorline only, with approval	No	with approval	No	5,136
Habitat Protection	IV	Yes	Yes	most, with approval	with approval	with approval	No	54,884
Multiple Use	VI	Yes	Yes	most, with approval	with approval	with approval	with approval	39,662
External link: Zoning and rules for the Temperate East Marine Parks Network

== See also ==
- Protected areas managed by the Australian government
