= Lord Howe Island Marine Park =

Protected area in Australia

- IUCN category II (national park)
- Interactive map of Lord Howe Island Marine Park
- Location: Australia
- Coordinates: 31°33′S 159°04′E
- Area: 465.45 km^{2} (179.71 sq mi)
- Established: 1999
- Governing body: Marine Parks Authority New South Wales
- Website: Official website

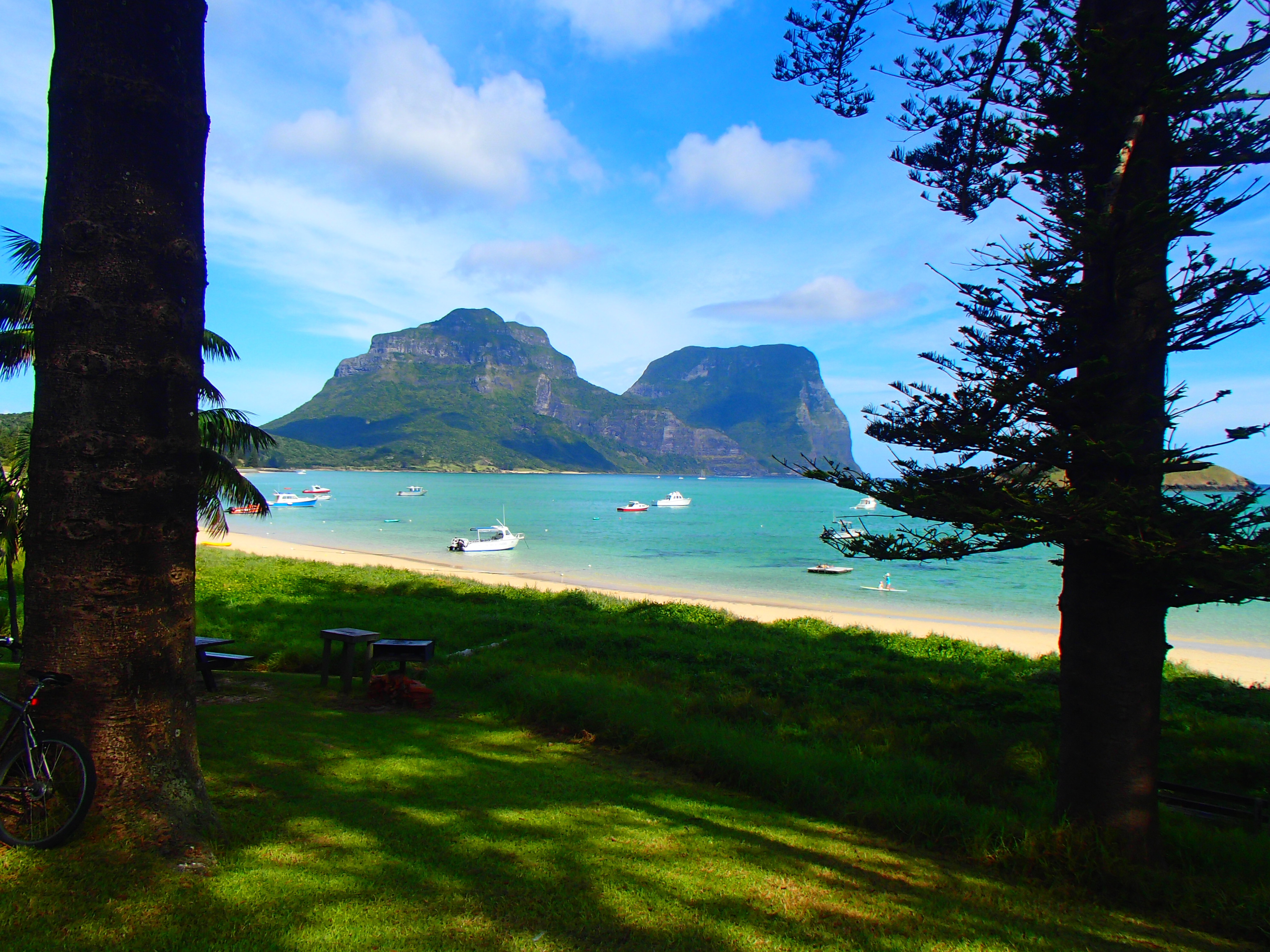
Mount Lidgebird and Mount Gower, twin Mountains to the south of Lord Howe Island

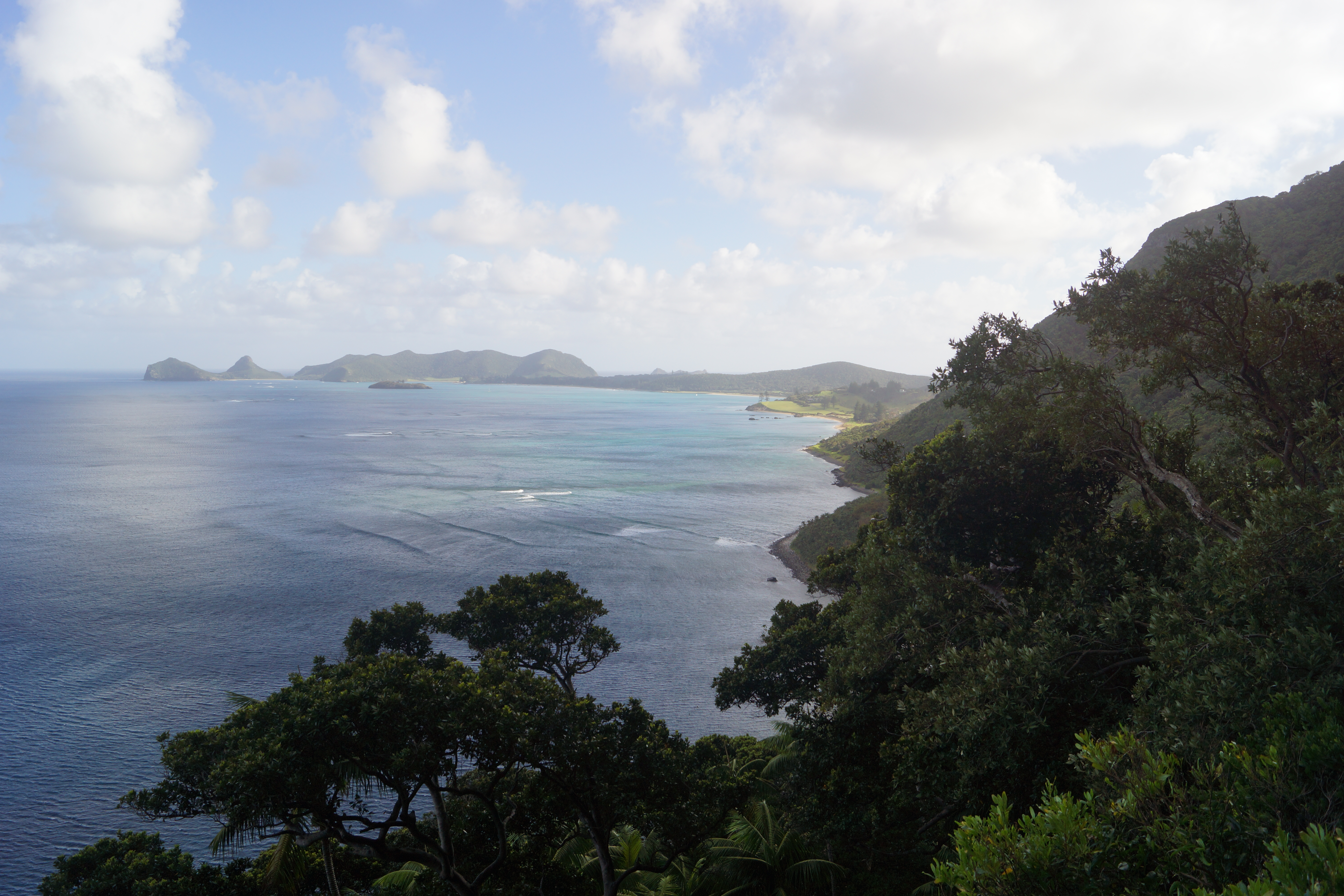
View of the Lord Howe Island lagoon, a part of the Lord Howe Island Marine Park

Lord Howe Island Marine Park is the site of Australia's and the world's most southern coral reef ecosystem. The island is 10 km in length, 2 km wide and consists of a large lagoonal reef system along its leeward side, with 28 small islets along its coast. In 1999, the waters within three nautical miles of Lord Howe Island (465.45 km^{2}) were declared a marine park under the NSW Marine Park Act 1997 to protect its unique marine biodiversity, with the park currently being managed by the New South Wales Marine Parks Authority. Both Lord Howe Island and Balls Pyramid are incorporated within the three nautical miles protected by the state marine park. Both marine parks complement the island's status as a World Heritage Site.

Lord Howe Island is located approximately 643 kilometres (400 mi) northeast of Sydney, New South Wales, Australia. Lord Howe Island is remote, has a biologically diverse marine ecosystem with a high degree of endemism. Lord Howe Island Marine Park was declared after it was recognised as an area with outstanding natural values, an extraordinary array of marine habitats and biodiversity, rich maritime cultural heritage and social and economic importance to the island community, giving it both national and international importance.

== History of management ==
=== Establishment of the Marine Park ===
The marine park was declared on 26 February 1999 under the Marine Parks Act 1997, with a zoning plan commencing on 1 December 2004 to protect the important natural and cultural values of the park while providing a range of sustainable uses. Due to its isolated geographic location, small size and limited access, there are a number of threats to biodiversity that require management. The marine park status helps protect marine biodiversity from fishing pressure and population pressure.

A range of scientific, social, cultural and economic information was collated to design the zoning plan. In August 2001 an Issues Paper was released for public comment and submissions reviewed. In June 2002, a draft zoning plan document was established outlining a number of options for zoning, incorporating the submissions gained through the public comment period, advice taken from the Lord Howe Island Marine Park Advisory Committee and a review of relevant information. This plan was released for public comment in December 2003 with a finalised zoning plan and implementation of marine park zones commencing on 1 December 2004. The waters from 3–12 nautical miles were declared a federal marine park on 21 June 2000, see Lord Howe Island Marine Park (Commonwealth waters).

=== Management practices ===
In 1999, the Commonwealth's Environment Protection and Biodiversity Conservation Act (EPBC) was enacted. The EPBC Act provides guidance about regional biodiversity conservation priorities through the implementation of the marine bioregional planning process. This process conserves marine biodiversity by considering the whole ecosystem a species is in and how different species interact in the marine environment. This process identified the regional conservation priorities in a number of different marine regions and identified the marine reserves to be added to Australia's National Representative System of Marine Protected Areas. Lord Howe Island Marine park was identified as requiring protection.

To protect the various marine conservation values associated with the waters around Lord Howe Island, the New South Wales government proclaimed the Lord Howe Island Marine Park in 1999. However, it wasn't until 2004 that a zoning scheme came into force due to lengthy negotiations with stakeholders. This zoning scheme partitioned the coastal waters of Lord Howe Island to permit different human uses, in order to minimise the threat to marine conservation values.

The objectives of the zoning plan under the Marine Parks Act 1997 include: 1) to conserve marine biological diversity and marine habitats, 2) to maintain ecological processes, 3) where consistent with the preceding, to provide for ecologically sustainable use of fish and marine vegetation, and 4) to provide opportunities for public appreciation, understanding and enjoyment.

The zoning plan for the Lord Howe Island Marine Park provides various levels of biodiversity protection, regulating activities according to zones. 73.2% of the Marine Park, known as Habitat Protection Zones, allows most forms of fishing: charter boat and recreational, but excludes spearfishing. The other 26.8% of the Marine Park are zoned as seven Sanctuary Zones, where fishing, anchoring and other harmful human activities are excluded. While 0.004% (1.7ha) of the marine park is considered a Special Purpose Zone used for special management needs, specifically to allow limited fish feeding. Lord Howe Island Marine park does not contain any General Use zones, like other Marine Parks in New South Wales. The zoning plan also contains regulations on specific activities and provides additional protection on species of particular importance.

The zoning plan gives protection to important natural and cultural values of the marine park, while allowing sustainable use including swimming, surfing, charter and recreational fishing, scuba diving, sailing, boating and research. Visitor numbers are restricted on the island to control impacts to the Marine Park.

== Climate ==
Lord Howe Island has a temperate climate, with mean water temperatures of 25 °C in summer and 18 °C in winter. Annual rainfall is 1650 mm in the lowland parts of the island.

Lord Howe Island's climate is moderated by oceanic air currents and mild sea temperatures. The island can be windy as the salt laden wind comes predominantly from the southeast and northeast and the mean wind speed is highest in late winter and spring.

== Biodiversity values ==
=== Geomorphology ===
Lord Howe Island is regarded as having high geological, geomorphological and geodiversity values, many of which extend to the habitats of the marine park. Lord Howe Island is situated at the southernmost limit of coral reef formation, receiving both tropical and temperate open ocean carbon environments. Slowly, over time Lord Howe Island is moving into reef forming seas due to the northward migration of Australia's tectonic plate, which is moving 5–6 cm north per year.

A white sedimentary rock known as calcarenite is locally important within the marine park as it makes up the central and northern regions of the island to below sea level in several places. Calcarenite is formed through the cementing of calcareous algae, coral fragments and sand. Dating has indicated that calcarenite was deposited in the past 350,000 years during the Pleistocene period.

The beach and shallow-water calcarenites indicate a sea level around 2–3 m above the present level during the last interglacial period (130,000-70,000 years ago, Pleistocene). Little evidence of reefs during this time can be seen as they may have occupied locations similar to those of modern reefs or were largely destroyed following emergence once the sea level fell.

The fringing reef on the windward western coastline of Lord Howe Island absorbs wave energy and acts as a breakwater preventing storm surges from eroding the low lying central region of the island. The sheltered lagoon contains a number of different reef habitats, dominated by sand, lagoonal corals, gravel sheets, algal flats and patch reefs.

=== Ecology ===
The high conservation significance of Lord Howe Island and its waters is recognised by its inclusion on the UNESCO World Heritage List in 1982. Conservation values relating to the marine park include the unique combination of tropical and temperature reef taxa, both flora and fauna. These unique taxa include a number of species at the limits of their distribution, reflecting the extreme latitude of the coral reef ecosystem, making Lord Howe Island Marine Park the southernmost true coral reef in the world.

Lord Howe Island Marine Park is also home to a high diversity of marine benthic algae, fishes and marine invertebrates and is associated with high levels of endemicity. Lord Howe Island was only discovered by humans in 1778, consequently the original flora and fauna has remained relatively untouched.

==== Flora ====
Three distinct marine habitat community types have been identified within the Marine Park: coral reefs, macroalgal beds, and offshore/open coast communities. The distribution of these depends on wave exposure. The Lord Howe Island Group supports more than 305 benthic algae species, including 47 endemic species. Hence, approximately 15% of the benthic algal species are endemic to the Lord Howe Island Marine Park. Also, two species of non-endemic sea grasses are found within the marine park: Eelgrass, Zostera muelleri subsp capricorni and Paddleweed, Halophila ovalis.

==== Fauna ====
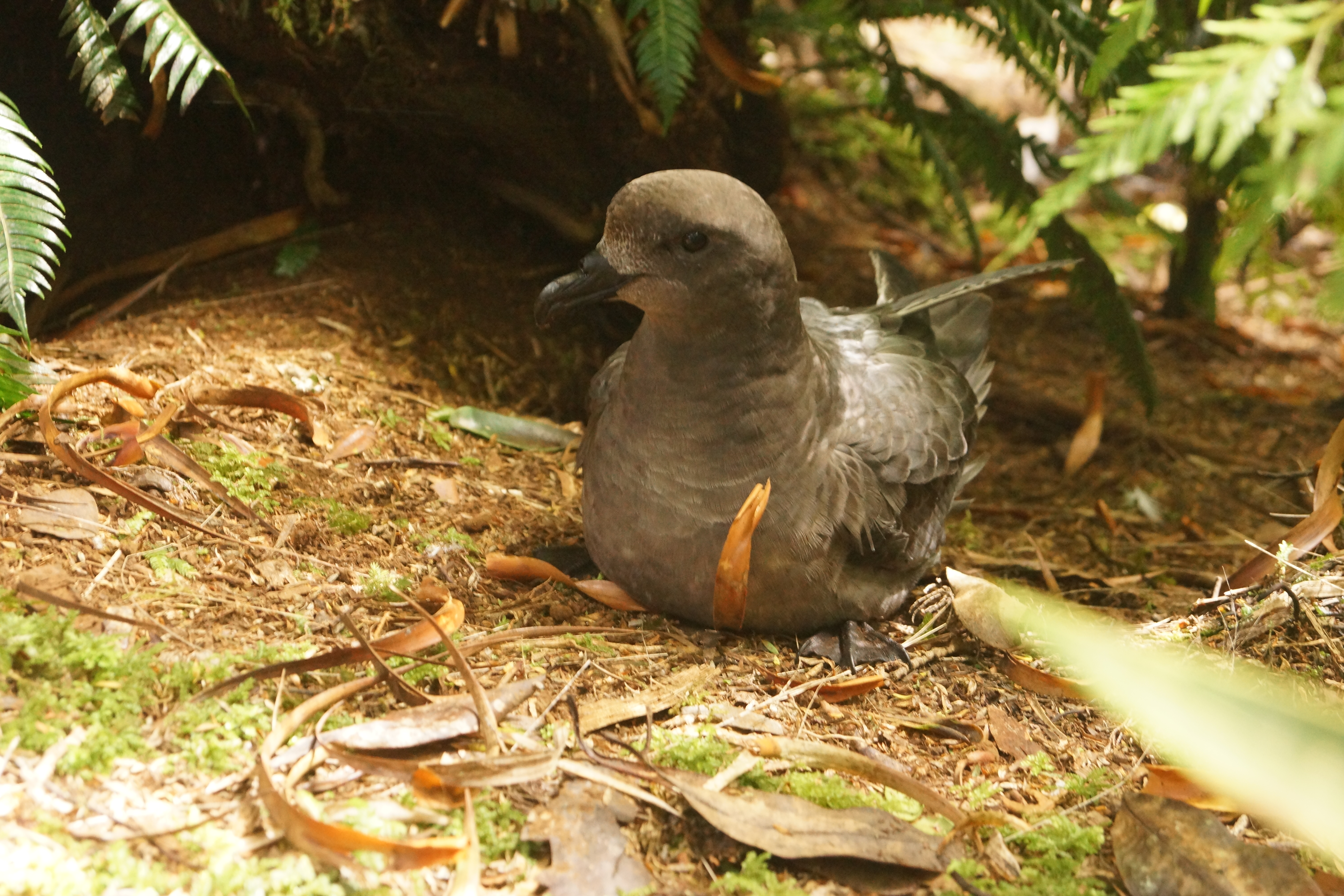
Providence Petrel, a Lord Howe Island seabird listed as Vulnerable under the NSW TSC Act

The marine life comprise both subtropical and temperate species due to its location and influence of the southerly flowing East Australian Current (EAC). As a consequence, the waters surrounding Lord Howe Island show rich and unique biodiversity. An extensive barrier coral reef protects a broad sheltered lagoon and sandy beach on the western side of the island, while fringing reef occurs immediately offshore of the beaches on the eastern side.

The Lord Howe Island Group supports a diverse inshore fish fauna with greater than 400 species recorded. 10% of the marine inshore fish species are known to be endemic, meaning they are only found at Lord Howe Island, while 8% of the 110 species of echinoderms are also endemic. A wide variety of seabirds roost and nest on the island but feed on schools of fish and squid. This diversity reflects the mixing of tropical species with temperate species and the range of marine environments present.

== Human impacts, environmental issues and threats ==
It is becoming widely known that the world's marine biodiversity is under threat due to overexploitation and degrading human activities, such as pollution rapidly changing species habitat and leading to species loss. Two species of plants, nine terrestrial birds, one bat and four invertebrate species have become locally extinct.

Isolated islands are under a disproportionate level of threat due to their small range and high level of endemic taxa. Even small human-induced disturbances can lead to species extinction. Key threatening processes relevant to the Lord Howe Island Marine Park include anthropogenic climate change, and entanglement in or ingestion of anthropogenic debris in marine environments.

Anthropogenic climate change is listed as a Key Threatening Process under the NSW Threatened Species Conservation (TSC) Act 1995 while loss of climatic habitat caused by anthropogenic emissions of greenhouse gases is listed under the Environmental Protection and Biodiversity Conservation (EPBC) Act. Climate change is likely to alter sea surface temperatures which can have severe consequences for seabird breeding.

There has been significant growth in people pressure over time. Visitor numbers have increased significantly as has the amount of available accommodation options. From 1988 to 2000 the Lord Howe Island population grew by 13%, the number of dwellings increased by 55% and the number of visitors increased by nearly 100%.

=== The marine littoral zone ===
Lord Howe Island has 37 km of shoreline or littoral zone, with only eight kilometres readily accessible. This eight kilometres has been most heavily impacted as most of the forest has been cleared to the edge of the beach, removing the buffer to strong prevalent winds, impacting the forest behind.

=== The lagoon ===
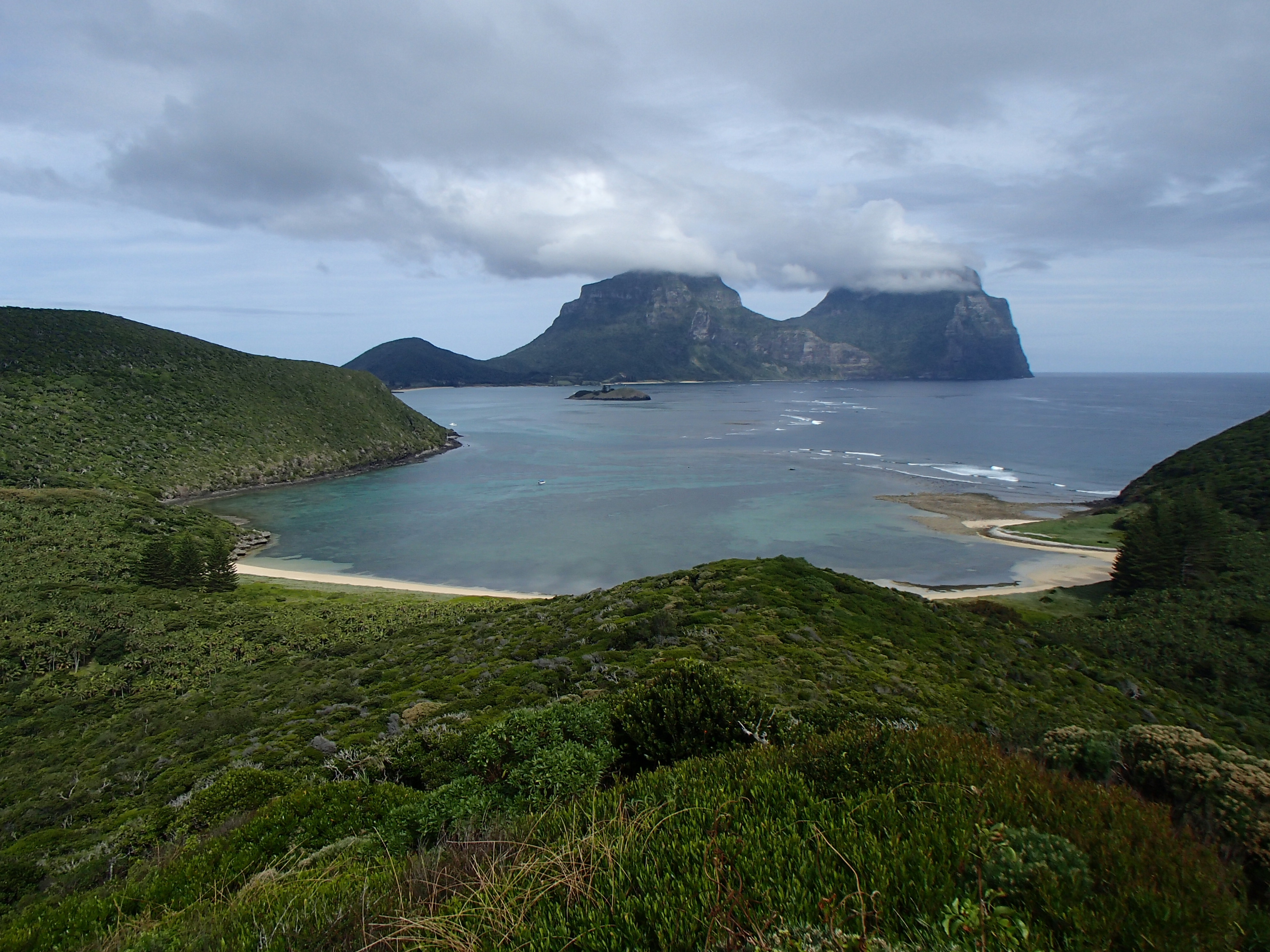
View of the lagoon from Mount Eliza. The lagoon forms the majority of the Lord Howe Island Marine Park

The lagoon is six kilometres long and 1.5 km wide and contains the largest of Lord Howe Island's coral reef system, assessed as having World Heritage values. The main identified threats to the marine environment are the impact of water quality welling up in the lagoon from groundwater, the potential changes of turbidity affecting the clarity of water in the lagoon, the impact from anchor damage (outside as well as inside the lagoon), overfishing particularly of the slower growing fish species which inhabit the drop-off, and dramatic water temperature changes causing coral bleaching and death of other marine species.

== Results of management ==
To abate human influence on marine biodiversity worldwide, marine parks are becoming widely advocated as a tool for conserving biodiversity and managing overfishing. Elsewhere, protected areas such as marine reserves have been attributed to increased species densities, biodiversity, species growth, biomass, and reproductive output. It is a similar case for the Lord Howe Island Marine Park

Species habitat is typically used as the major component of designing marine parks: if a number of habitat classes are protected, so are the species within them, hence effectively protecting and hopefully in turn increasing marine biodiversity. This is the goal of the marine park at Lord Howe Island.

A study conducted in 2010, six years after the implementation of zoning showed the mean number of fish species, density and biomass of fishes is typically higher in sanctuary zones than in habitat protection zones where fishing is allowed. The mean cover of hard corals was also higher in sanctuary zones.

Sanctuary zones have been found successful in protecting key species and biomass, though longer term datasets and further research into increasing subtidal macro algal communities in sanctuary zones is required.

A review of other research following the implementation of the Marine Park has outlined a number of successes and negative outcomes. This research found the Galapagos shark, Carcharhinus galapagensis increased in number in sanctuary zones, while there was an increase in abundance of the endemic double header wrasse, Coris bulbifrons, bluefish, Girella cyanea and the spotted sawtail, Prionurus maculates, in sanctuary zones.

Negative outcomes have shown populations of the habitat modifying urchin, Centrostaphanus rodgersii, increased threefold between 2006–2010 and densities of the second most abundant urchin, Heliocidaris tuberculata, has doubled. If sea urchins become overpopulated, they can have major impacts on reef systems through overgrazing of important algae. Other negatives include a large and significant decline in population of bluefish within habitat protection zones.

While there will continue to be both success and failures following the implementation of the marine park, the successes will continue to outweigh the failures until such time that equilibrium within the marine ecosystem is reached, this can take up to 20 years from the date of implementation.

== See also ==
- Lord Howe Marine Park
