= Lord Howe Island Marine Park (Commonwealth waters) =

- IUCN category VI (protected area with sustainable use of natural resources)
- Location of Lord Howe Island in the Tasman Sea
- Interactive map of Lord Howe Island Marine Park (Commonwealth waters)
- Location: Australia
- Coordinates: 31°38′22″S 159°10′10″E
- Area: 3,000.63 km^{2} (1,158.55 sq mi)
- Established: 2000
- Governing body: Commonwealth Department of the Environment
- Website: Official website

UNESCO World Heritage Site
- Official name: Lord Howe Island Group
- Location: Australia
- Criteria: Natural: (vii)(x)
- Reference: 186
- Inscription: 1982 (6th Session)

Lord Howe Island Marine Park (Commonwealth waters) is a former marine protected area managed by the Commonwealth Department of the Environment, protecting the waters surrounding Lord Howe Island. It was adjacent to the 465.45 km^{2} Lord Howe Island Marine Park managed by the Marine Parks Authority New South Wales. On 8 November 2012, it was replaced by a new protected area known as the Lord Howe Commonwealth Marine Reserve.
