= Joan Andrews =

Joan Andrews may refer to:

== Fictional characters ==
- Joan Andrews, character in Best Friends Together
- Joan Andrews, character in Night Time in Nevada

== Other uses ==
- Joan Andrews (politician), running mate of William A. Marra
- Joan Andrews (ship), see Colonist
