= Aeolus (1850) =

Wooden Ketch ship built in 1850

History
- Name: Aeolus
- Owner: Unknown
- Port of registry: Sydney
- Ship registration number: 23/1854
- Ship official number: 41095
- Builder: T Chowne Sydney Harbour, Pyrmont, New South Wales, AUSTRALIA
- Completed: 1850
- Fate: Wrecked

General characteristics
- Type: Wood Ketch
- Tonnage: 47 GRT
- Displacement: 47 NRT
- Length: 19.4 m (63 ft 8 in)
- Beam: 4.7 m (15 ft 5 in)
- Draught: 1.9 m (6 ft 3 in)
- Installed power: NA
- Ship primary use: Transport
- Ship industry: -
- Ship passenger capacity: Unknown

Aeolus was a wooden ketch built in 1850 at Pyrmont, New South Wales, Australia. She was carrying timber to Sydney, New South Wales, when she was lost at Hole in the Wall, Jervis Bay, New South Wales, on 24 October 1867. The wreck has not been located, but its approximate position is 35.134648°S 150.745874°E.

== Service history ==
Æolus started to ply the Australian coast under Captain Watts who made for Wide Bay in December 1850.

Æolus in December 1851, while on a journey from "FEEJEE ISLANDS" with W Cocks as the master, assisted along with the whaler Jane in taking off survivors from the wreck of the Tyrian, which on 24 November 1851 had struck Elizabeth Reef in the early hours. The Tyrian had been carrying 46 passengers and crew. The Æolus returned to Sydney with her master and her crew of 7, as well as 2 cabin passengers, 3 steerage passengers from the islands, and 4 passengers and 3 crew from the Tyrian

During the early 1850s she made a number of trips to the Richmond and Tweed Rivers, returning to Sydney with a cargo of hardwoods.

By 1854 she had taken up trade in the Shoalhaven whilst still continuing her northward trips.

By 1858 she was also starting to carry coal from the Newcastle, New South Wales coal fields.

In August 1864 John McAveny, then master of the ketch Æolus, was sued by both Thomas Maneon and Nathan Clements, members of the crew, for a balance of wages. The court ordered the sum of £1, due to Maneon for services as a seaman on board the vessel. Clements obtained back pay to the sum of £2 15s 4d due to him for wages as a seaman.

== Shipwreck ==
Æolus, under the command of Captain R. Taylor, left Jervis Bay for Sydney on the 23rd with a SW wind, then put back in and brought anchors up in Darling Roads at 6 am the same day. During the afternoon the wind blew in heavy squalls from the WNW to WSW, and at about 3pm on the 24th she parted her anchors and went ashore at the farmer's port Hole in the Wall. There were no deaths.

On the 25th the vessel was lying on her broadside full of water, a total wreck. The crew proceeded to unrig the vessel and at midnight left in the ketch Dauntless and arrived in Sydney at 4pm on the 26th.

Her cargo consisted of 13,000 board feet (31 m^{3}) of hardwood. The Æolus was insured for £500 in the Sydney Marine Office.

She was owned by Mr. Davis, of Pyrmont.

The Colonial-built ketch Æolus, while stranded in Jervis Bay, was put up for sale by auction, by BRADLEY, NEWTON, and LAMB. The ketch Æolus was described as:

46 tons register, as now stranded on the beach in Darling Roads, Jervis Bay. She was: copper-fastened newly coppered in February last. A list of sails, &c., landed on the beach, may be seen at the sale rooms.
