= Middleton Reef =

Reef in the Coral Sea, Australia

Coordinates: 29.455142°S 159.118539°E

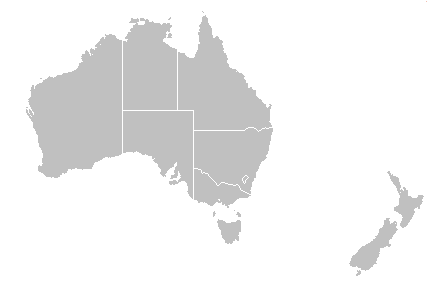
Location of Middleton Reef east of New South Wales

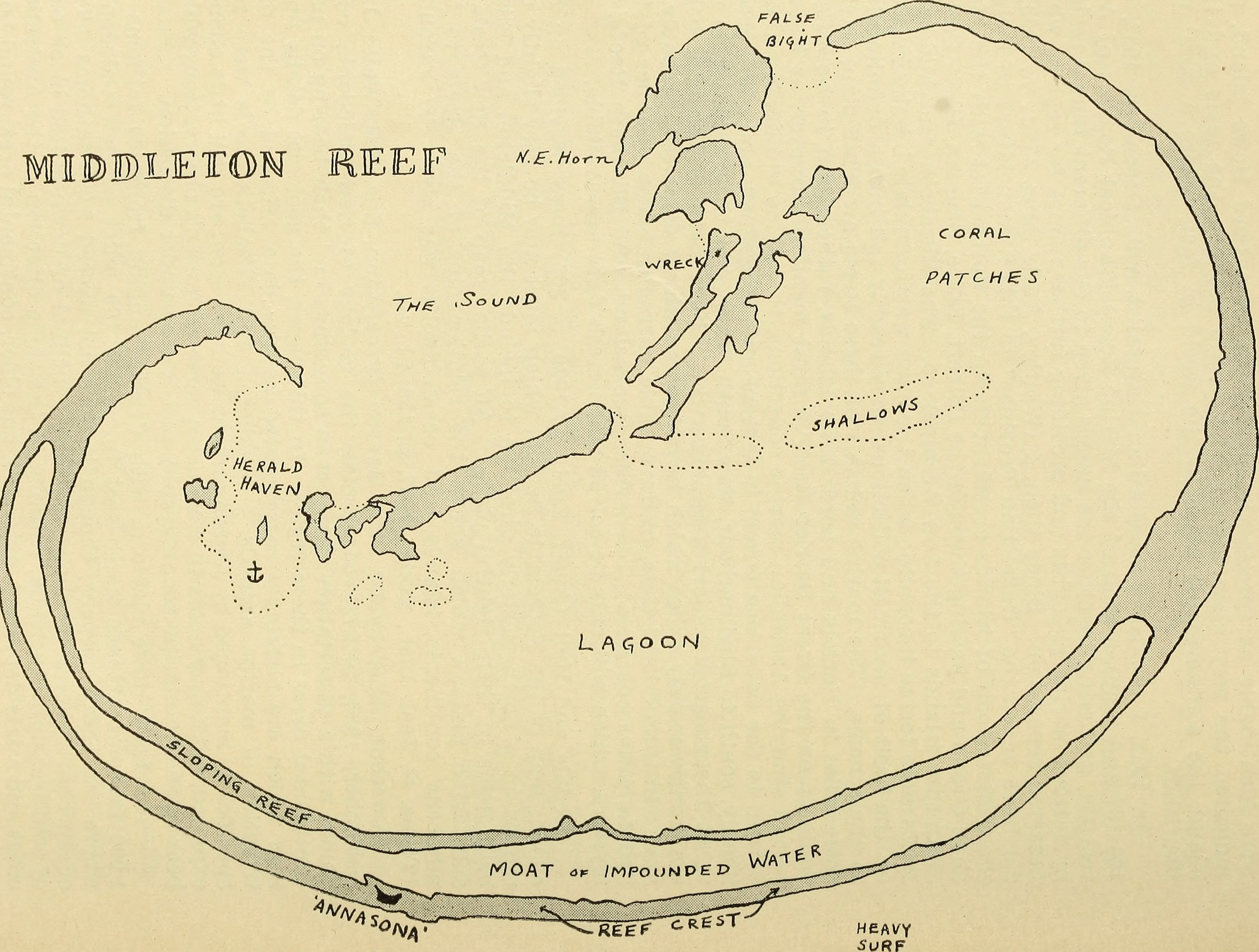
1934 map of Middleton Reef

Middleton Reef is a coral reef in the Coral Sea. It is separated by a deep oceanic pass some 47 km wide from nearby Elizabeth Reef, forming part of the Lord Howe Rise underwater plateau. It is around 230 km from Lord Howe Island and 555 km from the coast of New South Wales. In 1997 the Environment, Sport and Territories Legislation Amendment Bill 1996 included the reef in Australia's Coral Sea Islands Territory.

It is among the southernmost platform reefs in the world. Despite its relatively high latitude, there is a wide variety of flora and fauna on the reef and in the surrounding waters, due to converging tropical and temperate ocean currents.

It is about 8.9 km long by 6.3 km wide. At low tide most of the reef flat is exposed, at high tide only one cay is visible, 100 m by 70 m in area and one metre above sea level in elevation.

The reefs form the Elizabeth and Middleton Reefs Marine National Park Reserve managed by the Government of Australia under the Natural Heritage Trust.

Middleton Reef image from NASA Millennium Coral Reef Mapping Project

== Flora and fauna ==
Surveys by the Australian Institute of Marine Science have highlighted healthy numbers of black cod Epinephelus daemelii, a threatened species in NSW waters. The survey in 2003 highlighted 111 species of coral and identified 181 species of fish. The number of recorded fish species is 311 across several surveys. High numbers of Galapagos sharks Carcharhinus galapagensis were observed at Elizabeth Reef, and may indicate that the reef is a nursery. Sea cucumber (black teatfish), Holothuria whitmaei, were also found in high numbers at Elizabeth Reef. While the 2003 survey found only small numbers of crown-of-thorns starfish, a survey in 2005 indicated that that species is now active.

== Shipwrecks ==
Along with Elizabeth Reef, the reef has been the site of numerous shipwrecks. According to the National Shipwrecks Database the ships stranded include: Middleton Reef: Agnes Napier, Annasona, Blue Jacket, Britannia, Defender, Maelgwyn, Mallsgate, Mary Lawson, Queen of the East, Stuart Russel, Runic, Fuku Maru no 7. Britannia is listed for both Elizabeth and Middleton Reefs. The yacht Sospan Fach was wrecked on Middleton Reef in 1974, and its crew of four was rescued after being stranded for six weeks, during which they lived on the wreck of the Fuku Maru.

Middleton Reef: Agnes Napier, Annasona, Blue Jacket, Britannia, Defender, Maelgwyn, Mallsgate, Mary Lawson, Queen of the East, Stuart Russel

Britannia is listed for both Elizabeth and Middleton Reefs.

== See also ==
- Lord Howe Marine Park
- Elizabeth Reef
- Lord Howe Seamount Chain
