= Tasman Front =

Pacific Ocean current

The Tasman Front is a relatively warm water east-flowing surface current and thermal boundary that separates the Coral Sea to the north and the Tasman Sea to the south.

== Naming ==
The name was proposed by Denham and Crook in 1976, to describe a thermal front that extends from Australia and New Zealand between the Coral Sea and Tasman Sea.

== Geography ==
Originating in the edge of the East Australian Current (EAC), the Tasman Front meanders eastward between longitudes 152° E and 164° E and latitudes 31° S and 37° S, then reattaches to the coastline at New Zealand, forming the East Auckland Current.

Topography plays a dominant role in establishing the Tasman Front. Data on the Tasman Front shows that the path of the front is influenced in part by the forcing of the flow over the major ridge systems. Meanders observed in the Tasman Front can be driven by meridional flows along ridges such as those observed at the New Caledonia Trough (166° E) and the Norfolk Ridge (167° E). Abyssal currents also drive meanders associated with the Lord Howe Rise (161° E) and Dampier Ridge (159° E).

== Oceanography ==
There have been a number of observational and modeling studies on this front in addition to a number of paleo-oceanographic studies of marine sediments. Contrarily, there have been few biological observational studies, but those have been conducted resulted in relating the physical features of the front to properties of fish communities. Likewise, there are even fewer studies relating biogeochemical properties to physical processes of the Tasman Front.

== See also ==
- Lord Howe Marine Park
