= Elizabeth Reef =

Coral reef in the Tasman Sea

Location of Elizabeth Reef east of New South Wales

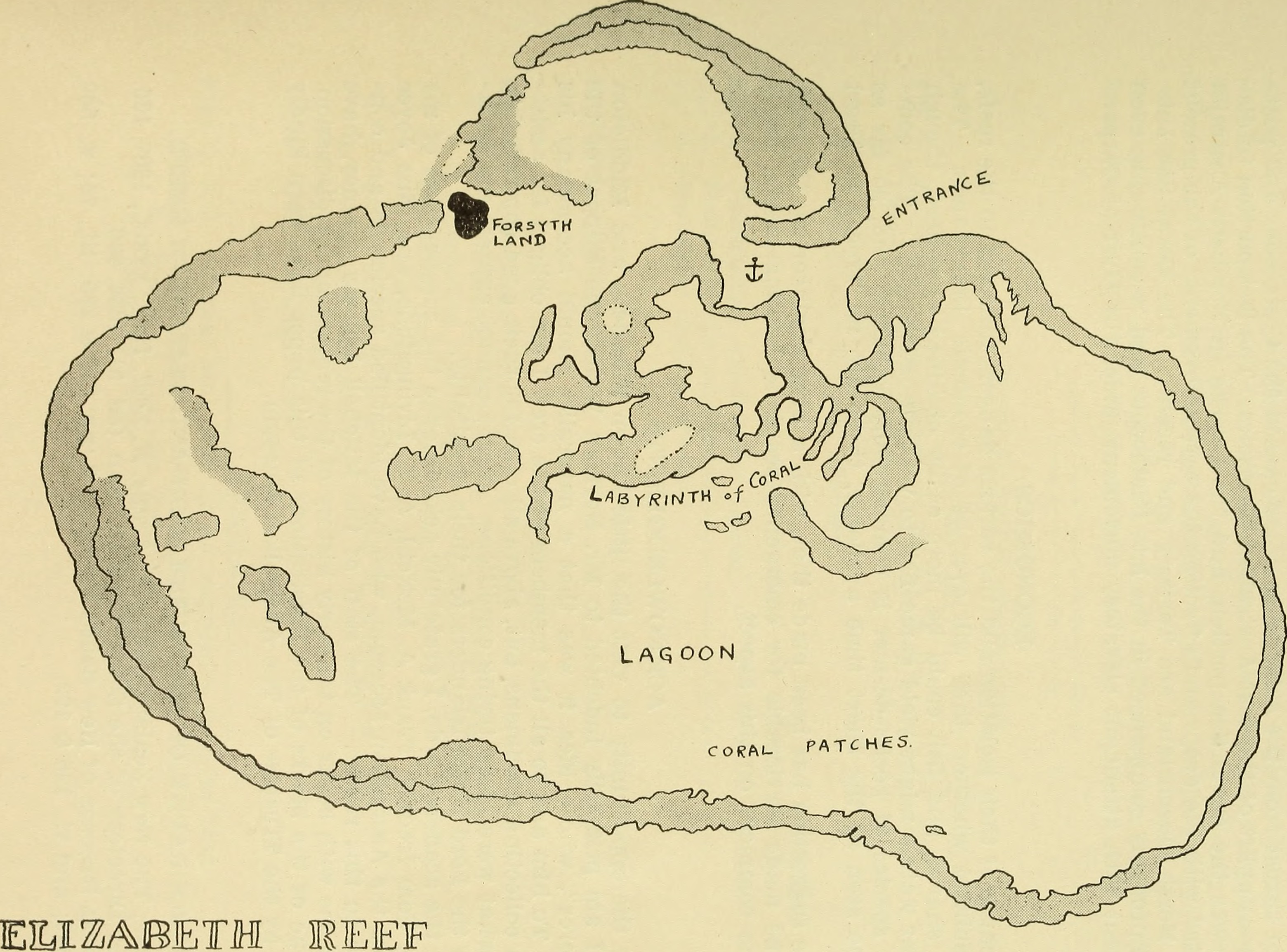
1934 map of Elizabeth Reef

Elizabeth Reef, located at 29°57′25″S 159°4′32″E, is a coral reef in the Coral Sea. The reef is separated by a deep oceanic pass, some 47 km wide, from nearby Middleton Reef, both of which are part of the underwater plateau known as the Lord Howe Rise. It is around 150 km from Lord Howe Island and 600 km from the New South Wales coast of Australia. The Environment, Sport and Territories Legislation Amendment Act 1997 included Elizabeth Reef in Australia's Coral Sea Islands Territory.

It is the southernmost coral atoll in the world and one of the southernmost platform reefs in the world. It measures 10.5 km by 6.1 km. Despite the relatively high latitude, a wide variety of flora and fauna exists on the reef and in the surrounding waters due to their location where tropical and temperate ocean currents converge.

At low tide most of the reef flat is exposed; at high tide, both a cay and a sand spit are visible. Elizabeth Island, with a diameter of about 50 m, is one metre above sea level. Elizabeth and Middleton Reefs form the Elizabeth and Middleton Reefs Marine National Park Reserve managed by the Government of Australia under the Natural Heritage Trust.

Elizabeth Reef image from NASA Millennium Coral Reef Mapping Project

== History ==
=== Sightings ===
David Blackburn, who had previously been the master of HMS Supply, had first sighted and named Middleton Reef (and was thus aware of it) in September 1788 what was then called Golden Grove shoal

The Golden Grove, on her return to this port, saw a very dangerous reef, the south end of which, according to the observation of Mr. Blackburn, (the master of the Supply,) who commanded her for the voyage, lay in the latitude of 29° 25' South, and longitude 159° 29' East. It appeared to extend, when she was about four leagues from it, from the N. E. by N. to N

This may have either been either a sighting of Elizabeth Reef (approximately 70 km to the South West) or a re-sighting of Middleton Reef (approximately 32 km to the West)

Elizabeth Reef has also been called Seringapatam reef or Clarke's Reef after the whaling ship Seringapatam and its captain, Clarke, who had been in the region of the reef in or about 1808

On 19 July 1815 Matthew Bowles, master of the Indefatigable, sailed past a reef with Joseph Arnold recording

The wind has been strong & foul, but we proceed to the Northward and Eastward. The Brig Campbell MacQuarie and the Ship Cochin sail very ill, so that we proceed slowly. This morning at day light we were close upon the an extensive reef which stretched from abaft the beam to nearly ahead, we were to leeward of it, and perhaps may think ourselves fortunate that the wind had been foul as we most likely should have run upon it during the night; for it did not appear that Capt. Bowles expected to fall in with it, for in the morning on my asking him whether it was down in the chart he said not, but that he thought it was part of Middleton's Reef. The Cochin was not in sight & we did not see her until nine o'clock. On referring to the Chart and making a calculation it appeared to be really Middleton's reef; though the master of the Macquarie denied it. The reef seemed to be very extensive and to run in ridges, for from the Mizen to I saw three or four one behind the other, with high breakers on each.

But their time keeper being incorrect its longitude was not ascertained

=== Naming ===
In 1820 an extract from the log book of the ship Claudine was published which described the discovery of Elizabeth Reef

Claudine and Marquis of Hastings, May 16, 1820, at 2:30 pm saw a range of breakers (from the masthead) in the NW quarter. At 4, tacked when they bore SW. At 5pm when within 2 cables length from the reef sounded in 14 fathoms, hard rocky ground when a ¼ of a mile from it 25 fathoms, then no ground. The east side of this reef lies about SSW and NNE one mile, but the greatest extent appeared to be from the ESE to WNW. The whole does not seem to be more than 3 miles in circumference having deep water within, and forming nearly a quadrangular the edges of which (with the exception of a few rocks are covered and the sea runs high over them. I saw no passage through therefore after asserting it situation we resumed our course to the Northward Latitude of the reef 30 5’ S longitude by time keeper 159 E. This being a new discovery, I have called it Elizabeth’s Reef

=== Surveys ===
In 1851 the survey vessel HMS Acheron under Lieutenant Huthwaite was dispatched from Sydney to the wreck of the Tyrian. The Acheron reported the location of the reef.

The first attempted dedicated survey of Elizabeth Reef was in June 1853, when HMS Herald, under Denham, after having surveyed Middleton Reef between 5 and 22 June, attempted to run from Middleton to Elizabeth Reef but came across Lord Howe on 22 June and then back to Sydney.

On 2 September 1853 HMS Herald again departed Sydney and arrived at Lord Howe Island on the 5th with the intention of surveying Elizabeth Reef but was prevented by boisterous weather and so sailed out further into the Pacific Ocean.

On the returning leg after a second visit to Fiji (25 June 1855 to 3 February 1856), HMS Herald again attempted to survey Elizabeth Reef in January 1856 where he ran a meridian distance between Middleton and Elizabeth Reefs, verifying the position in relation to Lord Howe Island, which has been described as sketchy

In 1878 Elizabeth Reef was surveyed by Lieutenant G. E. Richards in HMS Renard, the plan of which is still published on the map AUS 213.

=== The Elizabeth Reef Lifeboat ===
After the wreck of the Colonist in 1870, a lifeboat was moored in the lagoon to support future ship-wrecked sailors, by providing provisions, medical supplies, charts, and compasses. However, this boat was eventually swept away in a gale and never replaced. Nonetheless, the subsequent wreck of the Alma provided shelter and was used as such by the survivors of the wreck of the Naiad.

== Flora and fauna ==
Surveys by the Australian Institute of Marine Science have highlighted a healthy number of black cod Epinephelus daemelii, a threatened species in New South Welsh waters. The survey in 2003 highlighted 111 species of coral and identified 181 species of fish. The total number of recorded fish species is 311 across several surveys. High numbers of Galapagos sharks Carcharhinus galapagensis were observed at the reef, which may indicate that the reef is a nursery. Sea cucumber (black teatfish), Holothuria whitmaei, were found in high numbers. While the 2003 survey found only small numbers of crown-of-thorns starfish, a survey in 2005 indicated that it was active.

== Shipwrecks ==
Both Elizabeth Reef and Middleton Reef have been the site of numerous shipwrecks. According to the National Shipwrecks Database, the ships stranded at Elizabeth Reef include:

Britannia was wrecked on 25 August 1806 and was a 301 burthen ton full-rigged whaler built in 1783 in Bridport, England, and owned by the whaling firm Samuel Enderby & Sons. The vessel also performed two voyages transporting convicts to Port Jackson.

Rosetta Joseph struck Elizabeth Reef on 1 December 1850 when on a voyage from San Francisco to Sydney. The 27-metre wooden barquentine was built at the Manning River by Moses Joseph, New South Wales in 1847 and was registered in Sydney The vessel was described as lying on the north-west side of Clarke's (or Elizabeth) Reef On 15 January the 66-ton schooner Bride departed Sydney for Elizabeth reef after having been chartered by J.S. Hanson with Captain Dalmage in command after 18 days at sea they discovered that the wreck had been visited by the whaler Jane, where its captain (Fowler) had secured all of the valuable out of the wreck and would hand them over to their lawful on arrival in Sydney The wreck of the Rosetta Joseph prior to the arrival of the whaler Jane had been visited by the whaler Canrarvon (sp Caernarvon) and an unknown American whaler. The Rosetta Joseph which was quite high and dry had remained a refuge for any crew wrecked on Elizabeth Reef for several years until 1858 when Captain J Chase of the American whaling barque Elizabeth Swift ordered his crew to destroy the wreck by fire for the copper bolts to some condemnation.

Tyrian ran aground and was wrecked at Elizabeth Reef on 24 November 1851. In December Aeolus (1850) and the Jane assisted in taking off survivors from the wreck back to Sydney. The 226 ton Tyrian was a wooden barquentine built at Scarborough in the United Kingdom in 1828 and was registered in London. The Tyrian stuck about 1 am, the sea carried the vessel over the outward barrier placing it high up on the inner reef, where it was tolerably protected from the sea. A longboat was sent to the nearest port under Captain Birkenshaw (formerly of the Minerva who was a passenger). After a passage of 5 days they made Port Macquarie. On 5 December HMS Acheron under Lieutenant Augustus George Donston Huthwaite was dispatched from Sydney to the wreck. The second Master Napoleon Sewell advised that the vessel had arrived at the site of the wreck on the 9th and brought back 6 stranded crew and learnt that on the 30th the Whaling Barque Jane had taken off 17 of the passengers and crew and that the schooner Aeolus had taken 4 passengers and 3 crew on 5 December. The Acheron reported the location of the Tyrian as 29°53′30″S 159°3′30″E and the Roseta Joseph as 29°52′30″S 158°55′0″E with the Roseta Joseph reported as lying 4 1/2 miles from the Tyrian. The 75 ton schooner William and James was reported to be salvaging the Tyrian in January 1852 where an entrance had been found in the reef to the NE with a large harbor where anchoring was done in 15 fathoms and 7 fathoms over the bar entrance at low tide.

The Packet, a whaling vessel, was wrecked at midnight during gale on 24 February 1857. The 25-metre brigantine with a Captain Davidson was on voyage to Sydney with a cargo of whale oil, 150 barrels and a crew of 26 was built at Prince Edward Island in Canada in 1849 and was owned by Messers Mitchell & Co. In January 1858 it was reported that Captain Doolittle of the American whaler Phantom (brig) was seen off Elizabeth Reef lying at anchor near the wreck of the Packet where he had secured a large quantity of the wreck and was burning it to get at the copper bolts.

The Douglas was wrecked on the SE extremity of the fringing reef at Elisabeth Reef on 8 May 1869. The vessel was on a voyage from Newcastle to China. The 36 metre wooden vessel is listed in the Sydney register as a barquentine was built at Machias in the United States in 1861. The wreck lies on the outer reef at about "5 o'clock".

Colonist was a general cargo and passenger schooner built in 1861 at Dumbarton Scotland by Denny & Rankine. It spent nearly 30 years plying the Western Pacific-based out of Sydney. It wrecked at midnight, on 22 May 1870 and later re-floated and returned to Sydney Harbour on 2 March 1871 more than eight months after having hit the reef with the vessel later sinking in Sydney Harbour on 1 March 1890.

The Alma was wrecked at Elizabeth Reef on 3 August 1883 while under the command of Captain John Paterson. The iron sailing vessel was launched as a 3 masted schooner built at Dundee in Scotland in 1854 by the Gourley Brothers but had been converted to a brigantine by 1880.

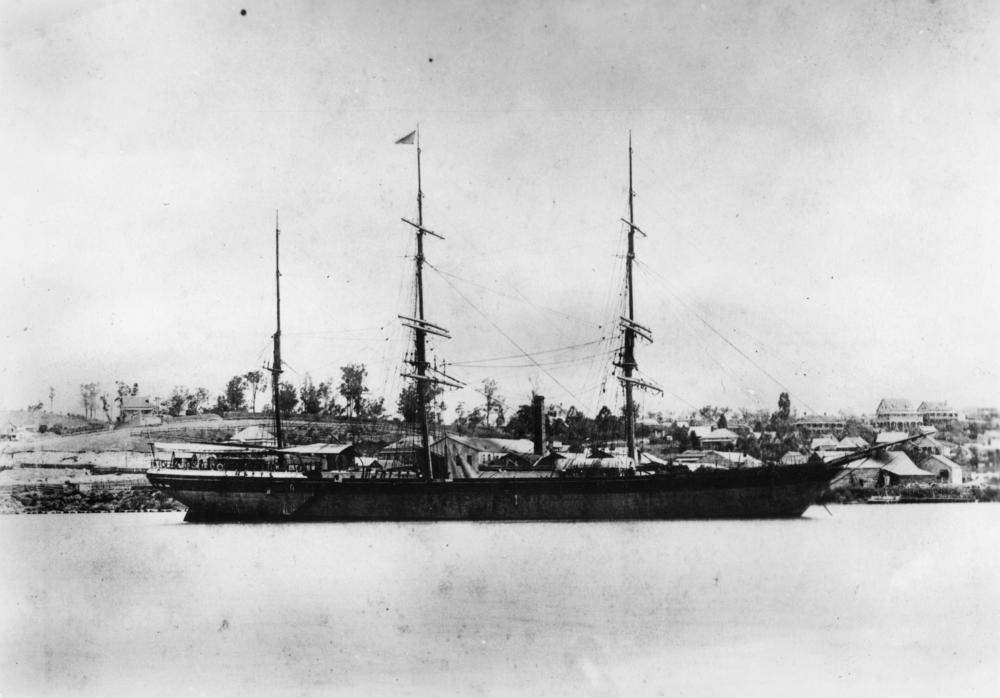
The iron ship Ramsey

The iron ship Ramsey ran aground and sunk on 31 October 1883. The vessel was 767 tons iron, three mast ship, later barque, 821 tons, ON45885, 209.5 × 32.0 × 19.2. She was built in 1863 by Gibson and Co., Ramsey. There is some disagreement as to where the vessel was wrecked. The vessel was originally reported as having been lost at Elizabeth Reef including at its Marine Court of Inquiry although by the following January the barque Reconnaissance reports salvaging material from the Ramsey at Middleton Reef and notes seeing the three-masted schooner Alma on Elizabeth Reef.

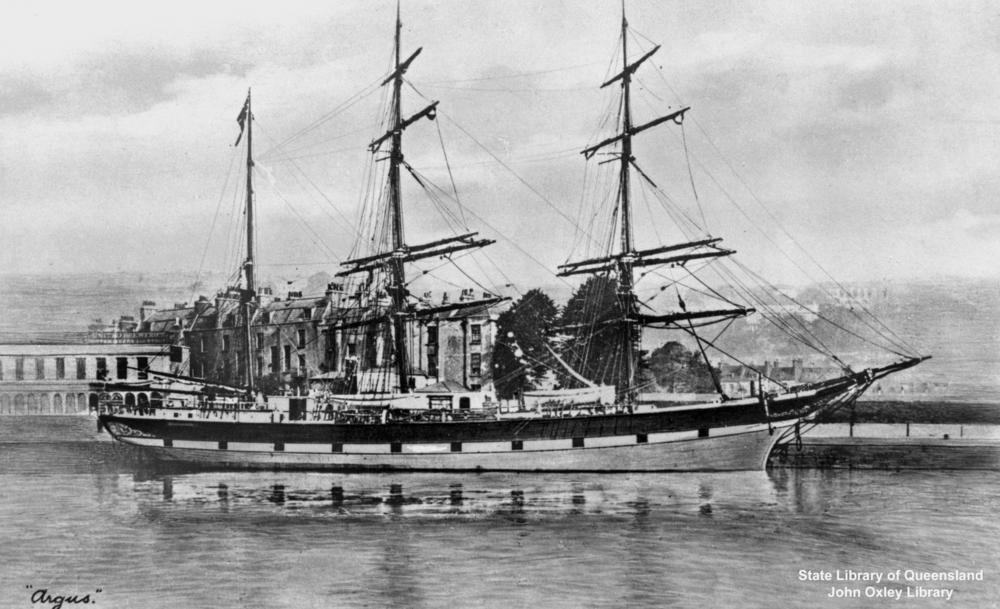
The fully rigged ship Askøy as it was when named the Argus

Askøy was wrecked at Elizabeth Reef on 27 December 1911. The vessel was built as the Argus by Barclay, Curle & Co., Glasgow, 1615 t, 255.5 feet. The Norwegian fully rigged ship was owned at the time of her loss by Marcussen Jens M. A., Risor and was on a voyage from Salavery, Peru to Sydney in ballast. Two boats were manned, and the crew equally divided, the captain taking one and the mate the other. The mate's boat, after six trying days and nights, reached Yamba, Clarence Heads whilst the captains arrived at Nouméa.

The Kaineo Maru was wrecked on Elizabeth Reef on or around 20 January 1969. It has also been referred to as the Yoshin Maru Iwaki or Kosim Maru. 29°56.019688′S 159°01.542613′E

British sailor Steve Landles was winched to a Royal Australian Navy Sea Hawk helicopter from the stranded yacht Lamachan on 2 August 2007; the yacht could not be recovered.

== See also ==
- Lord Howe Marine Park
- Lord Howe Seamount Chain
