= Colonist (1861) =

Schooner

Coordinates: 33°51.355′S 151°14.318′E

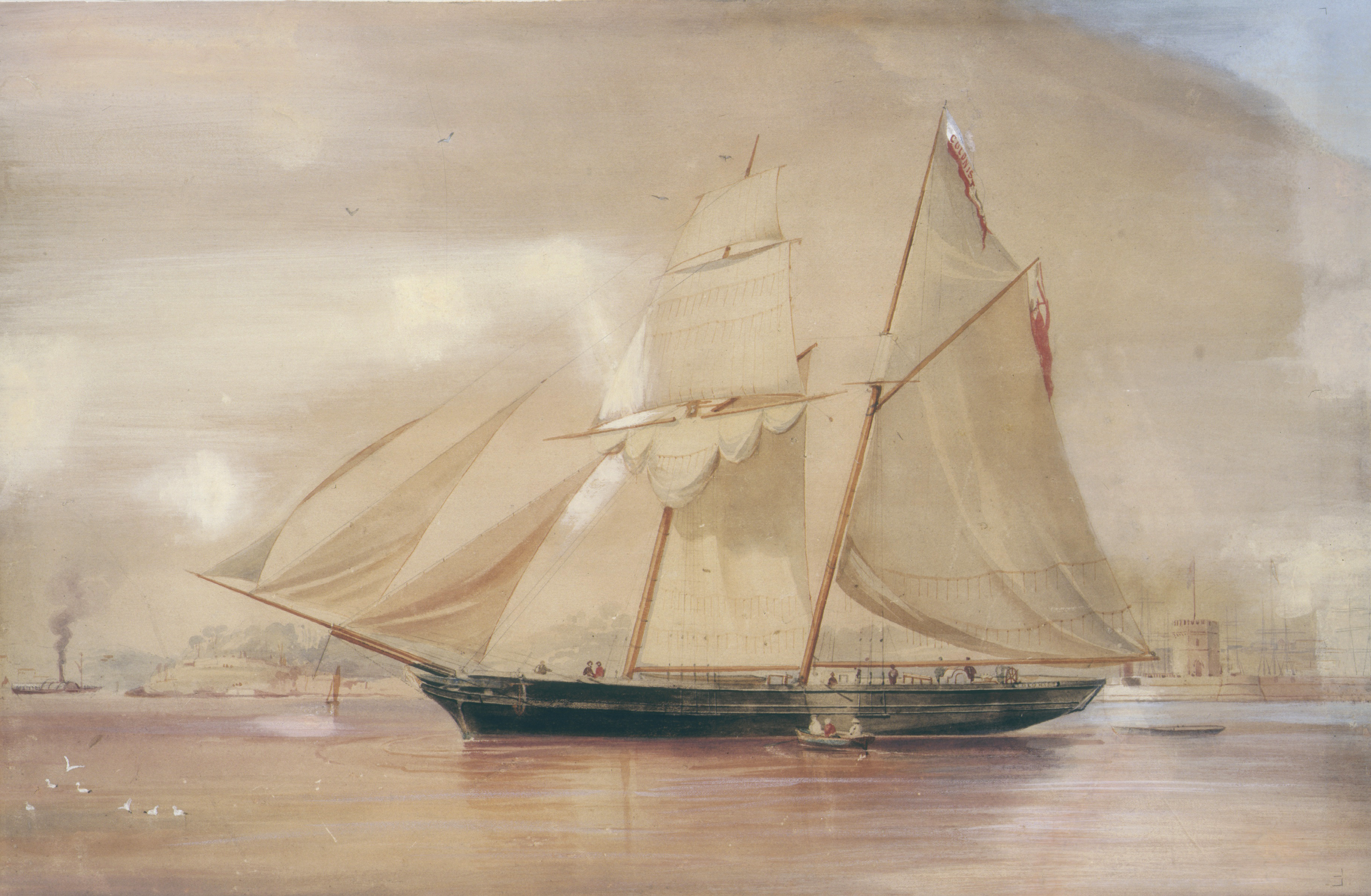
- Schooner Colonist near Fort Macquarie

History
- Name: Colonist
- Owner: John Phillips
- Port of registry: (United Kingdom) British (1861–62); (United Kingdom) Sydney (1863–70) 57/1863; (United Kingdom) Sydney (1871–90) 6/1871
- Ship registration number: 57/1863 later 6/1871
- Ship official number: 43699
- Builder: Denny & Rankine, Dumbarton, Scotland
- Yard number: 140
- Launched: 1861
- Fate: Wrecked

General characteristics
- Type: Mainly described as a schooner but also a smack and a brigantine
- Tonnage: 105 GRT
- Length: 76 feet 6 inches (23.32 m) post 1871 78 feet 6 inches (23.93 m)
- Beam: 20 feet 1 inch (6.12 m)
- Height: 10 feet 5 inches (3.18 m)

Colonist was a general cargo and passenger schooner built in 1861 at Dumbarton Scotland by Denny & Rankine. It spent nearly 30 years plying the Western Pacific-based out of Sydney. It wrecked and later re-floated on the remote Elizabeth Reef 550 km from New South Wales, as well as being involved in the gold rushes. Its master was murdered before it was finally involved in a collision in Sydney Harbour, in which it was sunk.

== Ship description and construction ==
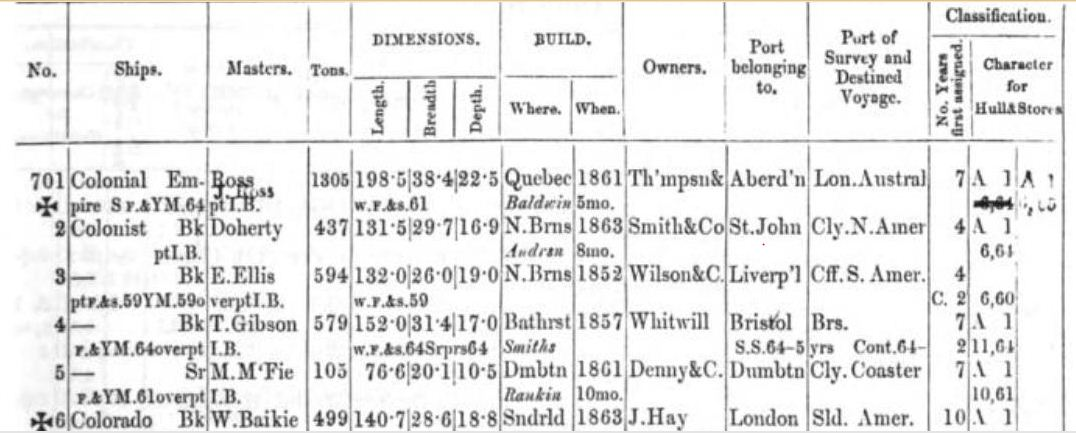
The Colonist's Lloyd's Register of British and Foreign Shipping 1867 entry

The Colonist was a wooden vessel with iron bolts and with a felt and yellow metal skin.

Length: 76 feet 6 inches (23.32 m)
Breadth: 20 feet 1 inch (6.12 m)
Depth: 10 feet 5 inches (3.18 m)

She was rigged as a schooner although sometimes described as a brigantine. She was built by Denny & Rankine in their 140 yard at Dumbarton in 1861.

== Ship service history ==
=== Maiden voyage to the Pacific ===
When the vessel arrived in Dunedin, New Zealand in April 1862 after a four-month journey it was described as:

The Colonist left the Tuscars, being the last land seen on the British coast, on the 18th of December last, and. under all the circumstances, may be considered to have made a most successful voyage out. She is but a small schooner, of only 105 tons, but she withstood wonderfully the various winds and weather which she encountered in the different latitudes, and proved herself a capital little vessel in sailing qualities and otherwise. In the tropics she was becalmed for about a fortnight, and when off Kerguelen Island met with a very violent gale, during the prevalence of which she shipped a heavy sea, but was in no way disabled, and she made out Stewart's Island on the 13th of this month. The Colonist was only launched shortly before departure, her builders being Messrs. Denny and Rankin, Dumbarton. As she is exceedingly well fitted for the coasting trade, it is probable that she will be retained as a regular trader between this and other New Zealand ports.

From this journey the "very superior vessel" then made its way over to Newcastle where it was then sold into the Australian service and purchased by the Sydney company Haynes, Brown, and Co in July 1862 to be placed into the colonial trade "for which she is exceedingly well adapted" and described as having proved to be "a remarkably fast ship" and "capable or stowing 200 tons".

When the vessel was preparing to leave in June for Guam, shipmaster Matthew McFie had William Hughes, one of the crew, charged with insubordination. While in court Hughes appeared "excessively loquacious and irregular in Court, being apparently under the influence of drink. In the course of his garrulous, but disconnected statement, he said that he was perfectly willing to go on board and resume duty". Due to this misconduct he was goaled for 24 hours.

=== 1862–1864 ===
During the first years of the Colonist's time on the Australian Coast it was mainly involved with the Sydney – Brisbane – Rockhampton run. The vessel was boasted about as making "the run from Sydney to Rockhampton in the short space of six days from wharf to wharf".

The vessel at this stage was mainly mastered by Charles Croft, who left in late 1863 to take command of the Faraway which was wrecked on Breaksea Spit at Maryborough on 9 February 1864.

=== 1864–1865 ===
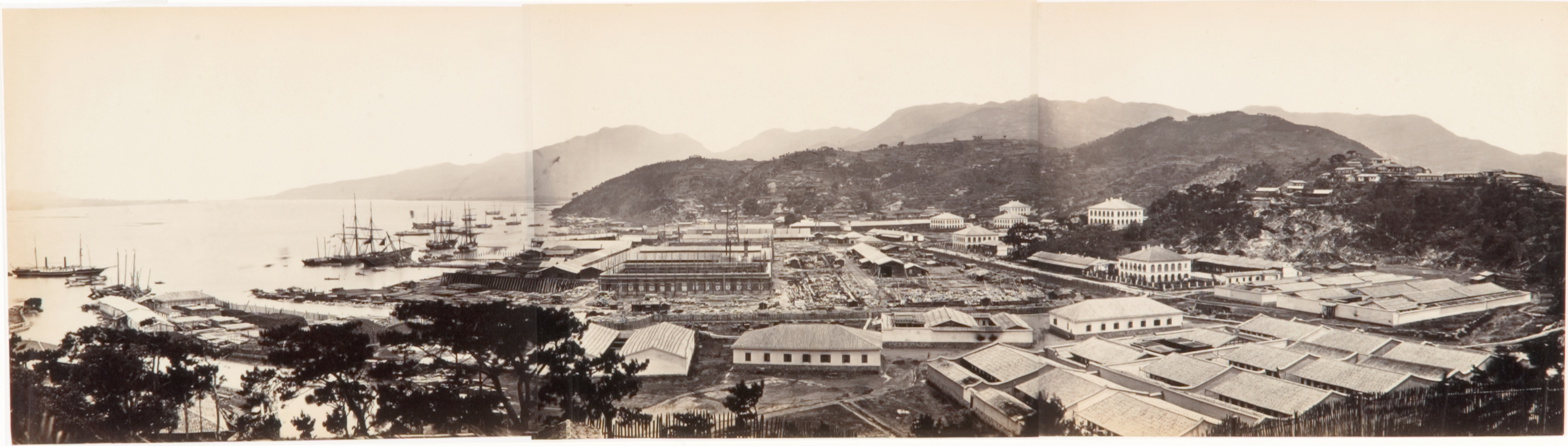
Panorama of the Foochow Arsenal showing the shipyard, harbour, buildings and a building site, Mamoi (now Mawei), near Foochow (now Fuzhou), between 1867 and 1871, two to five years after the Colonist visited

During this period, the vessel was mastered by Joseph H. Scaplehorn and started to move off the Australian coast and venture into the western Pacific, visiting Guam, Batavia (Jakarta, Indonesia) and Foo Chow (Fuzhou, China).

Guam at that period was still under the command of the Spanish, while Batavia was the head of the Dutch East Indies, and Fuzhou was one of the five treaty ports which had been opened to the British at the end of the First Opium War 20 years earlier and just three years after the end of the Second Opium War.

The Colonist under Captain Scaplehorn completed one of the fastest passages on record at that time, having been only 65 days from Foo Chow to Sydney, by completing this voyage in four and a half months, it again proved the vessel to be possessed with no ordinary sailing qualities.

During 1865 the vessel was reported as sold by Messrs. L.E. Threlkeld and Co either to Messrs A, Tange and Co, for the sum of £1600 in January (which may have fallen through) or alternatively at auction in November.

=== 1865–1866: Masters Pearce, Mason and Kelly ===
The vessel continued to ply its trade on further visits to Fuzhou as well as trips to Petropavlovsk Russia just 10 years after the Siege of Petropavlovsk during the Crimean War. During one of these trips the vessel ran into a gale:

The schooner Colonist left Sydney on the evening of the 10th instant, for Petropaulovski, and has had to contend with the late prevailing N.E. gales, and had made good her passage until abreast of Smoky Cape, by which time all the head stays and gear had been carried away, and from the heavy working of the vessel, she commenced leaking, which increased to 700 strokes per hour, when Captain Kelly deemed it prudent to bear up. No sights were obtainable until Saturday last, when she was found to be abreast of Jervis Bay. The appearance of the schooner is a sufficient guarantee of the violent gales she must have encountered.

The vessel also undertook several trips to Hokitika, New Zealand, taking prospectors and supplies for the West Coast gold rush affecting that region.

=== 1870: Wreck on Elizabeth Reef ===
Elizabeth Reef

During the period of 1869 and 1870 the Colonist had settled into a period of regular visits between Sydney and New Caledonia under the command of Alfred Douglas Millar Geach. During one of these regular runs the vessel hit Elizabeth Reef. After having left Sydney on 18 May 1870 with a full cargo of general merchandise and sailing for a day and a half, when it encountered a storm on the 21st it was thought to be off Lord Howe when

At midnight, on the 22nd, Captain Geach went below to mark off the schooner's track, when the chief officer called out, "hard up," and within a few seconds she struck the reef on the south side. The schooner was under double-reefed canvas at the time, and a fearful sea running. All sail was kept on her for the purpose of hardening her on the reef. The first sea swept. over her, and burst through the mainsail; the second stove in the boat, and In this state she remained until daylight, when the boat haring been temporarily repaired the crew left on the 23rd, and got safe into; the lagoon in smooth water. The next thing done was to construct a raft, on which the crew remained when it became dangerous to be on board the wreck; and it was, on consultation determined to make the boat as substantial as possible and a portion of the crew by this means might reach the mainland, and obtain assistance for those left on the reef. With considerable labour two strakes were added to the topsides, formed out of paling's which were on board, and on the 14th June all was ready for a start. The crew drew lots as to who should go in the boat, and they fell to Captain Geach, the chief officer, the steward, Mr. Simmens a passenger, and two natives.

On 21 June the schooner Joan Andrews under Captain Stewart, while on a run from Rockhampton to Sydney, picked up the crew in the lifeboat and brought them to Sydney. On the evening of 28 June the government vessel Thetis left Sydney for the reef and arrived there late the next day.

It was low tide when the ship's boat was launched approximately 400m from the wreck, and proceeded to the wreck by a combination of rowing and dragging. Aboard the boat was the chief officer of the colonist (Mr. Hawkins) had travelled with the Thetis when approximately 200m from the wreck they were met by the remaining crew of the Colonist. As the weather was unsettled and the tide was low it was decided to spend the night aboard the Colonist and tell the Thetis to stand off in deeper water.

They left the Colonist approximately 9 am the following morning with the six remaining crew of the vessel who had been on board the wreck for 40 days. During their stay a whaler had been seen but made no attempt to rescue them latter followed by a Brig which had stopped and lowered a boat but had been unable to find the entrance to the lagoon and sailed around the reef until the Thetis was seen when it then sailed away.

==== Salvage of the Colonist ====
The salvage operations commenced almost right away on 13 July 1870; the ketch Comet departed Sydney to salvage the cargo. This was sollowed by the schooner Scotia almost a fortnight later to assist, and by mid-September the Comet had again proceeded back out to the site.

When the Comet left the reef in late September to return to Sydney with salvaged cargo it left its captain (Paget) out on Elizabeth Reef with two carpenters as well as caulkers and riggers. At this stage they had already partially succeeded in getting the vessel off the reef.

By November the ketch had again returned from the wreck site with cargo from both the Colonist as well as the Douglas, and the scene was described as:

...masts and yards as well as hull of the Colonist are as sound as the day she was built. She has been thoroughly caulked from keel to covering board, and is now quite tight, her rigging has been refitted and sails bent. The tides have been very bad lately, but notwithstanding she has been floated more than halfway over the reef; and Captain Paget, who remains with one man at the reef, expects that she will be in deep water at the next spring tides. The Douglas still remains with royal yards aloft.

Captain Paget's salvage attempts continued until the Colonist returned to Sydney Harbour on 2 March 1871 with himself and four crew on board, more than eight months after having hit the reef. Upon its return it was placed on

Cuthbert's patent slip, Sussex street; and, upon examination, it appears extraordinary that considering she has been so long on the Elizabeth Reef, she has sustained so little damage. The frame of the vessel is intact; no straining is perceptible, and, with the exception of the ordinary chafing, the schooner has suffered no material injury.

=== 1878: New Guinea gold prospecting ===
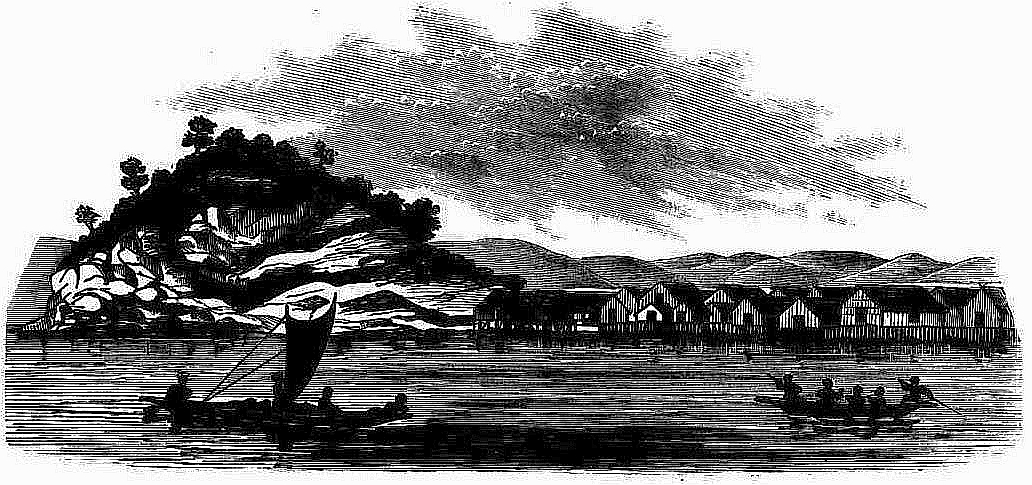
Sketch of Port Moresby in early 1878, when the missionary found alluvial gold just a few months prior to the Colonist arriving

Gold was first discovered in Papua New Guinea in 1852 as accidental traces in pottery from Redscar Bay on the Papua Peninsula on Captain Owen Stanley's survey of Papua New Guinea's south coast. In early 1878, a missionary found alluvial gold about 40 miles inland from Port Moresby.

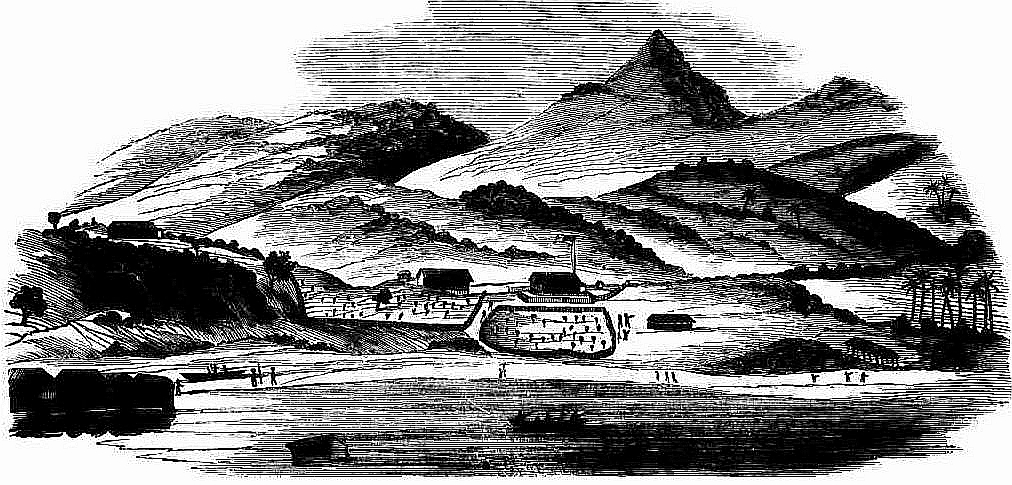
Mission Station at Port Moresby in early 1878

In March the Colonist, then owned by Mr. White, put together the first major prospecting party to travel to Port Moresby via Cooktown with about 25 prospectors travelling from Sydney and about another 10 being onloaded at Cooktown. They were described as "having a firm determination to give the reports of the existence of gold at New Guinea a fair trial for six months. They each ship about five cwt provisions and outfit, and many of them are equipped with guns and other defensive weapons, as well as with the appliances for prospecting." The sea journey was expected to take 25 days or so. The prospectors grouped together in parties of five or so, and were all paying for their own passage (about £12 each) as well as being "practical miners, and the majority of them have means of their own so that in the event of failing in their search they will not destitute if they return home."

Upon reaching Cooktown the ship took on additional provisions. "Stalls for nine horses have been erected between decks, immediately under the after hatch. Twelve horses will, we understand,-be taken, if three of the number can be stowed on deck. Each of the men from Sydney is armed with a rifle and revolver, and there are several fowling pieces amongst the party." As well as having items for trade including " tobacco, turkey red cloth, beads, ect, and all have expressed a determination to treat the New Guinea natives fairly; by paying for everything they may require, and otherwise respecting their rights, so as to keep up friendly relations with them".

At the arrival of the Colonist in Port Moresby it presented papers from the colonial secretary in Brisbane to William Bairstow Ingham (whom Ingham is named after) appointing him "agent for the Queensland Government" in the area. At that stage Ingham, Kendall Broadbent (a naturalist who collected the first frill-necked monarch) and Andrew Goldie (naturalist who has the Goldie's bird-of-paradise named after him) were the only European inhabitants of Port Moresby in early 1878, with Ingham having only arrived two months earlier. Ingham's stint as the Queensland Government agent was short, as on 28 November 1878, he and 6 others were murdered and eaten on Brooker (Utian) Island in the Calvados Chain of the Louisiade Archipelago.

By August the Colonist had left the prospectors returning to Sydney.

=== 1889: Murder of Shipmaster William Greenlees ===
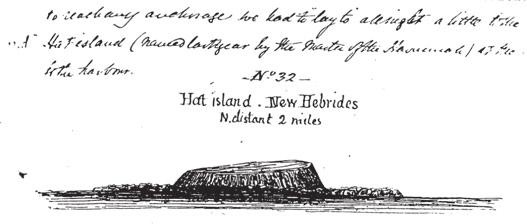
Sketch of Eretoka Island (Hat Island), Vanuatu at the entrance of Havannah Harbour where the murder took place, drawn by Philip Doyne Vigors, while serving in Naval vessel HMS Havannah.

On 22 May 1889 whilst the Colonist was lying at anchor in Havannah Harbour in the New Hebrides Group the shipmaster William Greenless was shot and killed by the supercargo of the vessel Henry Ernest Weaver.

HMS Lizard was lying at Havannah Harbour at the time and a boat from her went all to the Colonist upon the report of firearms on board being heard. On boarding the schooner It was found that the captain had been shot while lying in his berth, and the body subsequently carried up and laid on the main hatchway. Weaver, the supercargo, was arrested by the officer from the Lizard with a sheath knife and two revolvers were taken from him, and he was convoyed to the Lizard, where evidence of the mate of the schooner and other eye-witnesses of the murder was taken. Subsequently HMS Opal arrived at Havannah Harbour from Noumea and Captain Bosanquet as senior officer and deputy commissioner of the Western Pacific High Commission assembled a High Commission Court on May 23. The result of the inquiry was that Weaver was committed or trial on a charge of wilful murder, and was remanded to the Court at Fiji and he and the witnesses were to be sent to Suva by the A.U.S. N Company's steamer Gunga.

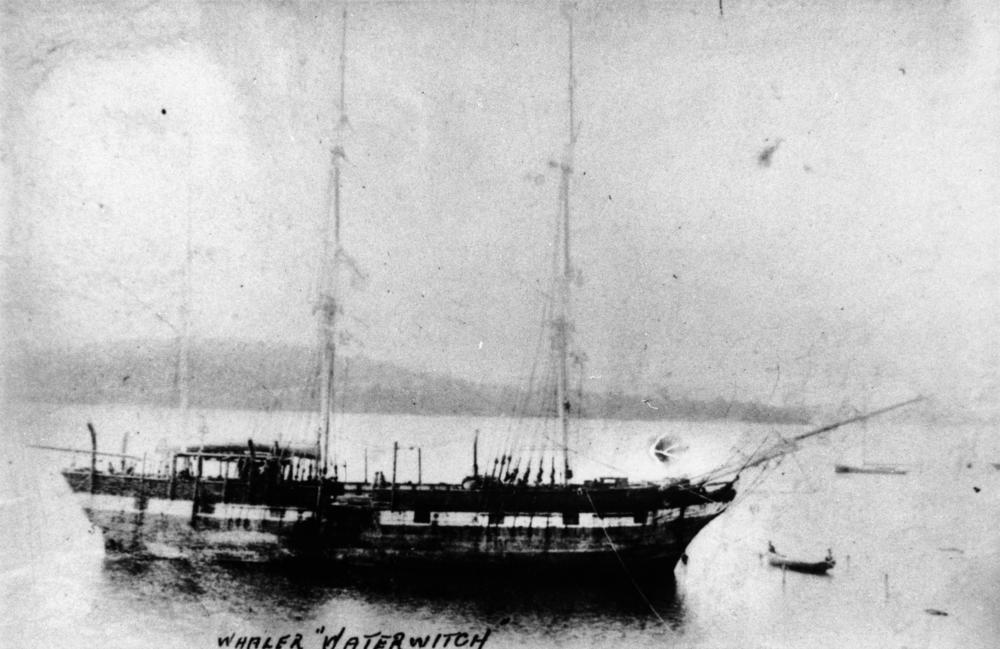
Water Witch prior to being wrecked on Masthead island under the command of Captain William Greenlees

Captain William Greenlees (Greenless) had been running vessels along the east coast of Australia since August 1855. He had worked his way up from smaller vessels and by 1868, he was the master of the 106-ton schooner Native Lass and was involved in blackbirding. From 1873 he was the captain of the Colonist for a number of runs, mainly involved in a Sydney Rockhampton run. 1877 – 1879 he was master of the schooner Heron, again actively impressing labour from the Pacific Islands. While in 1884 he was in command of the Brigantine Water Witch which was wrecked on Masthead island. Upon his death his widow was provided with £100 from the National Shipwreck Relief Society which was £30 above the membership entitlement.

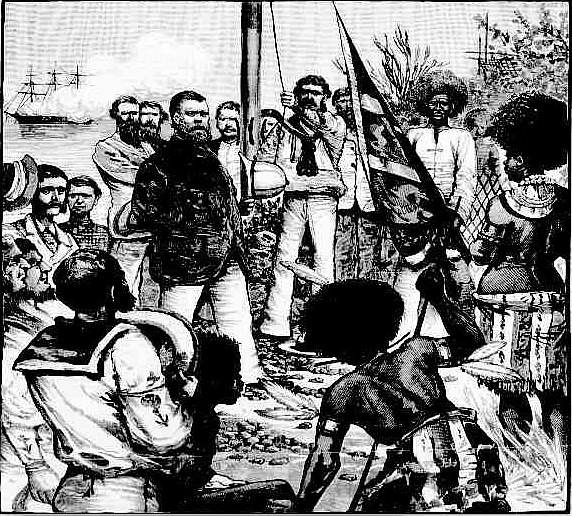
In April 1883 the Queensland Government schooner Pearl formally annexed New Guinea with the captain and five of the crew watching the proceedings at approximately the time Weaver was on board with the Pearl further surveying areas of the New Hebrides.

Henry Ernest Weaver (captain / supercargo), had been married in London in 1873 and then made his way to Brisbane. In March 1875 the master (Goodall) of the Queen May, a regular blackbirding vessel, died whist unloading supplies at Rockhampton. The mate then took over command but was then caught by floods in Rockhampton. So Henry Weaver was appointed as captain but after about a day and a half at sea the crew reported Weaver as insane and had fears for his safety. Alexander Goodall, aged 18, and a son of the just deceased Captain Goodall, was chosen by the crew as master and he proceeded back to Gladstone and handed Weaver over to the authorities.

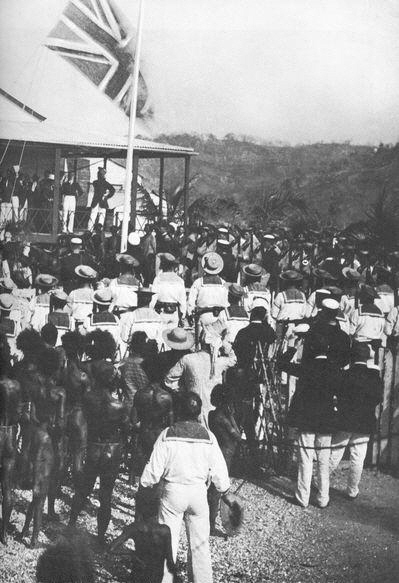
Photograph of the annexation ceremony, with Weaver likely to be present

By 1876 Weaver was declared insolvent by his own petition due in part "to sickness, want of employment, and pressure on the part of creditors" with a debt of £212 14s. 6d. with no assets. By 1879 he had been appointed sub-lieutenant of the Queensland Government schooner Pearl.

In May 1884 Weaver was sentenced to 9 months imprisonment for "obtained goods to the value of £6 15s from W. Royle by means of a valueless cheque".

Prior to the Colonist leaving, Sydney Weaver had endeavoured to induce a friend of his to visit an island with him. Weaver related an extraordinary tale of hidden wealth on the island which was known only to him. The vessel cleared ostensibly for the Christmas Islands with no cargo and only a quantity of spades and firearms on board. The charts on board the schooner showedthe position of Christmas Islands and, as Weaver took all the sights himself, no one on board but he knew where the vessel was going.

The Colonist put into Havannah Harbour for provisions and afterwards visited several islands. Weaver continually boasted that the clearance of the vessel was fictitious and often repeated to the officers the tale of the hidden wealth.

Additionally Weaver had told various stories, as that he was on important business for the Imperial Government of a private nature, that he was going to play the part of Rajah Brooke on some island to the north, and that he was going to an island where there was an immense quantity of pearl shells ready collected, and waiting for him.

In the High Commissioner's Court at Suva, Fiji, on 19 August 1889, before the Hon. Henry Spencer Berkeley, Chief Judicial Commissioner, Captain Weaver was sentenced to death by hanging. This sentence was then commuted to imprisonment for life.

Captain Weaver later returned as a passenger of the steamer Norkoowa from the Solomon Islands in March 1906 and landed in Brisbane suffering from malaria just under seven years after the murder. By late March he had made his way down to Sydney.

By August 1908 Weaver had organised a syndicate of ten men who had committed to paying £100 each to charter a vessel to go to Malaita Island in the Solomons, partly for treasure and partly to look for minerals that Captain Weaver said he knew to exist. The Wheatsheaf was charted and Weaver represented himself as head chief or king of the island. Upon reaching the Solomons the vessel went to Aola, then to Tulagi, the seat of government, and Woodford plantation. They went from there to Maululu, Maribo, and Sao. Here Weaver had some trouble with the natives. Weaver indicated to his investors that there had been a great earthquake which had altered the face of the island, and that his great friend the previous chief had been dead for two years.

A meeting amongst the investors was held, and as the result Captain Weaver was told that they had no confidence in him; thus at Sao he resigned his command.

Captain Weaver was returned to Sydney in the steamer Moresby in September. The Wheatsheaf continued on, in an attempt to recoup costs, but found nothing. Charles Mason, one of the investors, shot himself with a revolver in the head 180 miles east of Moreton Bay.

== 1890: Collision and sinking ==
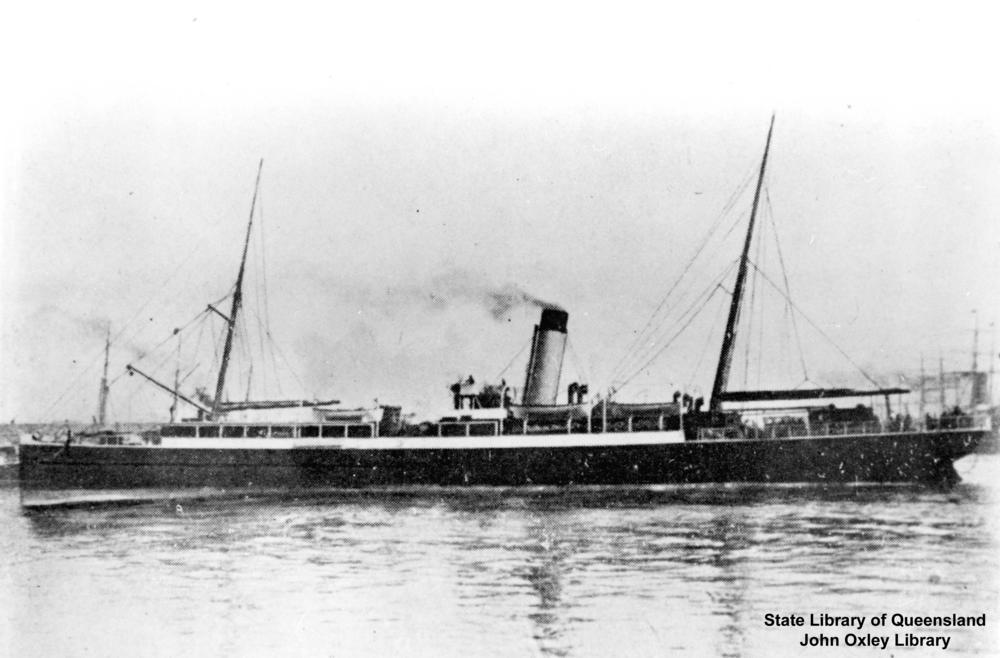
SS Adelaide, which struck and sunk the Colonist

The Colonist left Kiama for Sydney at 6:20 am on Saturday 1 March 1890 loaded with blue metal and entered Sydney Heads at about 3pm that day and beat up the West Channel of the harbour. At 4:45 the vessel was on a tack from Shark Point heading for Garden Island, when the steamer Adelaide came into sight on the northern side of Pinchgut. The Colonist had cleared Bradleys Head and was midway between there and Garden Island with the Adelaide heading to Clark Island when the collision occurred. The Colonist was struck on the starboard side aft of the fore rigging with the schooner sinking almost immediately.

Two of the crew took to the rigging and managed to clamber aboard the Adelaide via its anchor chains. Two of the crew and Captain Wilson were picked up from the harbour although the mate Frederick Taylor was lost and his body recovered several days later.

The survivors who were picked up from the water were picked up by the skiff half decker Young Oscar. It first picked up the master who was in a life ring, exhausted, and after some difficulty was gotten aboard over the stern. Another then clambered aboard; they then saw a man face down and lifeless who they managed to drag aboard. After they worked on him for 20 minutes he regained consciousness.

The mate's body was recovered on Wednesday floating somewhat near the scene. At the Marine Court of Enquiry it was found that the captain of the Colonist was at fault by lufting his vessel across the bows of the steamer Adelaide but under the circumstances they considered nothing more than a "reprimand and cautioned to be more careful in the future" would be required.

=== Wreck site and wreckage ===
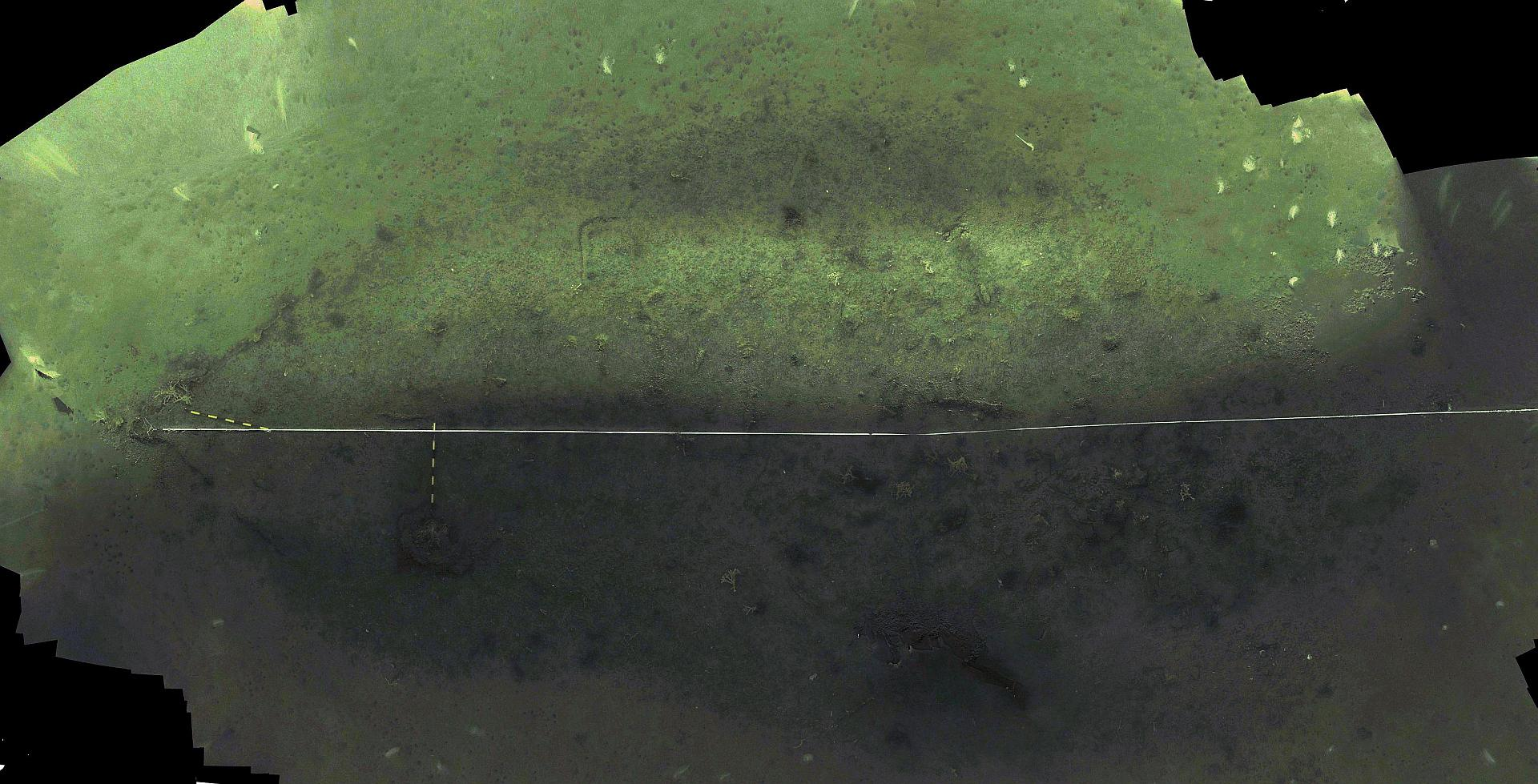
Underwater photogrammetry of the wreck site of the Colonist, made up from 529 images

The vessel was described to have sunk:

"The schooner was about three cable lengths off Bradley's Head"
"I could judge the collision occurred exactly half way between Garden Island and Bradleys head"
"The collision took place between Bradleys Head and the north of Garden Island about three and a half cable lengths from the former point not quite halfway between the two"

The Marine Board ordered the removal of the schooner which had sunk in the channel and this was conducted on Wednesday 23 April with the vessel

Blown up by dynamite last night. It was intended to have fired the charges at 5 o'clock in the evening; but at that hour the sunken vessel was so thickly surrounded by boats, it was deemed inexpedient to proceed with the work, and 9 o'clock was decided upon. The knowledge that large numbers of fish would be thrown to the surface stunned by the shock influenced the attendance of small boats to a marked degree in the afternoon, and though there were not nearly so many at night the number was larger than was expected, and caution had to be observed. Three mines were laid, each of 50lb., and were successfully fired. Amass of the wreckage was thrown to a great height, the vessel's mainmast also coming up. An immense volume of water was thrown into the air, and, after matters had subsided, it was seen that vast numbers of fish of all sizes and descriptions were floating on the surface. A grand haul was made by the boats on the spot one of the largest fish picked up, familiarly known as a jewfish, was found to measure 7ft. in length. It is intended to send the divers down at daylight today, and as the mines were so placed as to blow the bottom out of the schooner, and so release the topsides and the deck, the hull should now be readily floated. The work was carried out solely by the Naval Brigade gunroom officer assisted by a few certificated men of the force, under the direction of the gunnery and torpedo instructors, Messrs. Rickwood and Baxter.

Over the next days the pilot steamer Captain Cook hauled away the mainmast and another charge of gun-cotton was used to blow the foremast out of the submerged hull. The mast and topsail yards sank, and they sent a diver down to clear it so that it might be towed away. The hull of the Colonist was well down in the mud.

The wreck lay in 20m of water on a silty bottom and was found on 13 May 2013. The muntz metal outline that originally clad the outside of the hull and a pile of basalt which was the final cargo of blue metal from Kiama are all that was visible. The bow can still be made out (basically pointing to the harbour bridge) and some concreted near here which is most likely anchor chain.

== Summary of voyages ==
Year	Month	Master of vessel	Route	Year	Month	Master of vessel	Route
1861	Dec-April 62	Matthew McFie	Glasgow-Dunedin	1870	January	Alfred Douglas Millar Geach	New Caledonia – Sydney
1862	July		Otago NZ – Newcastle NSW		March	Alfred Douglas Millar Geach	New Caledonia – Sydney
	July	Sale of vessel	Sale of vessel			Shipwreck on Elizabeth Reef	Shipwreck on Elizabeth Reef
	Aug	Charles Croft	Newcastle – Melbourne	1871	March	Charles Paget	Elizabeth Reef – Sydney
	Aug	Charles Croft	Melbourne – Sydney – Rockhampton	1872			
	December	Charles Croft	Rockhampton – Sydney	1873	October	William Greenlees	Rockhampton – Sydney
1863	January	Joseph H. Scaplehorn	Rockhampton – Sydney	1874	July	John McAvery	Maryborough – Sydney
	May	Joseph H. Scaplehorn	Sydney – Rockhampton	1875	January	John McAvery	Nauganui – Sydney
	August	Joseph H. Scaplehorn	Rockhampton – Sydney	1876			
1864	February	Joseph H. Scaplehorn	Sydney – Guam	1877			
	June	Joseph H. Scaplehorn	Batavia – Sydney	1878	March		Sydney – Port Morsby
	December	Joseph H. Scaplehorn	Foo Chow – Sydney		August	J.A. Borstel	Port Douglas – Sydney
1865	January	Possible sale of vessel	Possible sale of vessel	1879	September		Tonga – Auckland
	January	William Pearce	Sydney – Petropavlovsk	1880			
	October	William Pearce	Foo Chow Foo – Sydney	1881			
	November	William Pearce	Hokitika – Sydney	1882			
	November	Possible sale of vessel	Possible sale of vessel	1883	March	William Simpson	Caroline Island – Sydney
	December	George Francis Mason	Sydney – Hokitika	1885			
1866	January	George Francis Mason	Hokitika – Sydney	1886			
	March	George Kelly (Mate previous trip)	Hokitika – Sydney	1887			
	May	George Kelly	Hokitika – Sydney	1888			
	June	George Kelly	Petropavlovsk – Sydney	1889	August	E. Williams	Havannah Harbour
1867					September	Alfred Douglas Millar Geach	New Caledonia – Sydney
1868						Alfred Douglas Millar Geach murder	
1869	February	Alfred Douglas Millar Geach	Maryborough – Sydney	1890		Collision and sinking	
	April	Alfred Douglas Millar Geach	New Caledonia – Sydney				
	June	Alfred Douglas Millar Geach	New Caledonia – Sydney				
	August	Alfred Douglas Millar Geach	New Caledonia – Sydney				
	November	Alfred Douglas Millar Geach	New Caledonia – Sydney				
	December	Alfred Douglas Millar Geach	New Caledonia – Sydney				
