= East Australian Current =

Currents of the Pacific Ocean

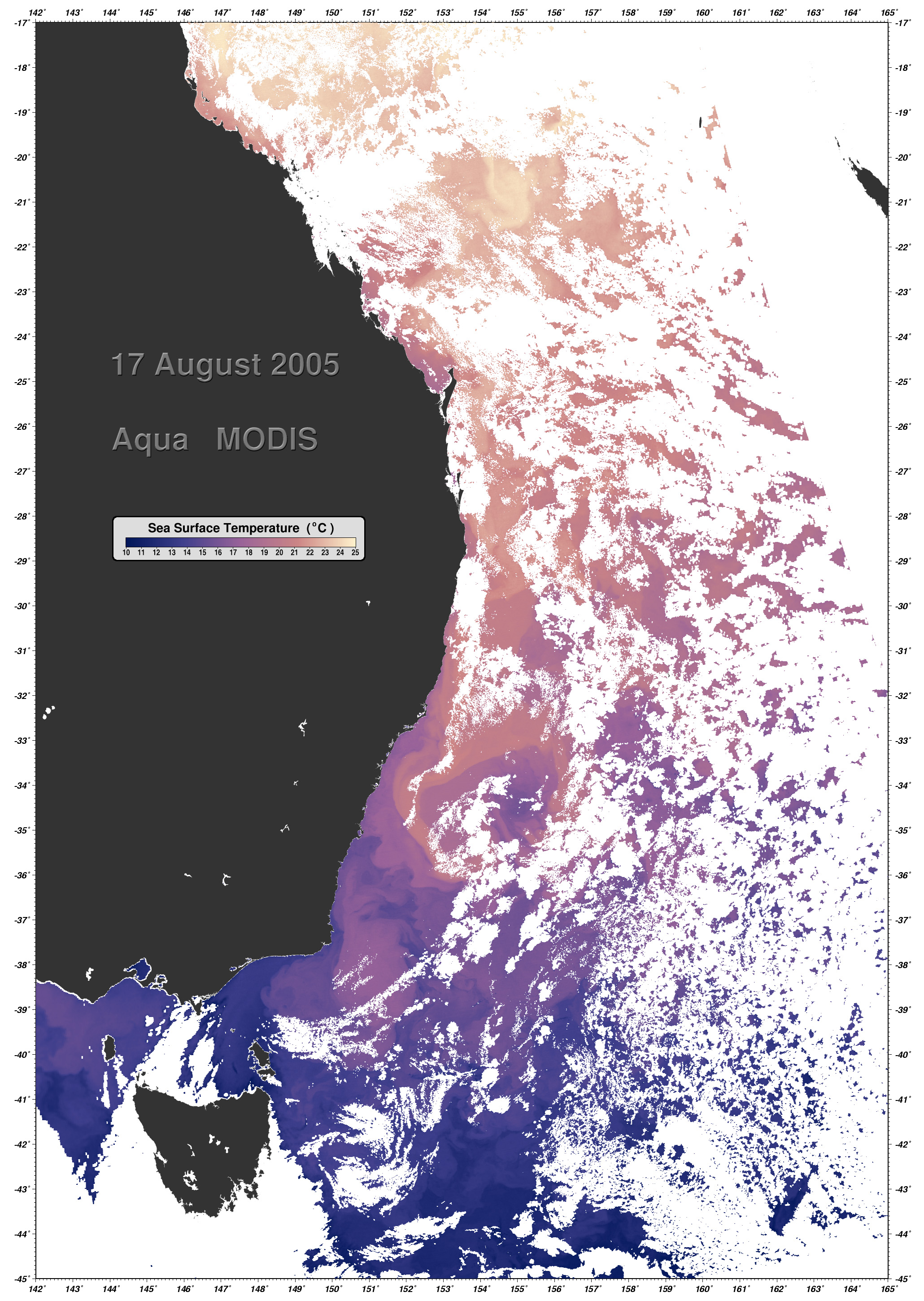
Thermal profile of the East Australian Current

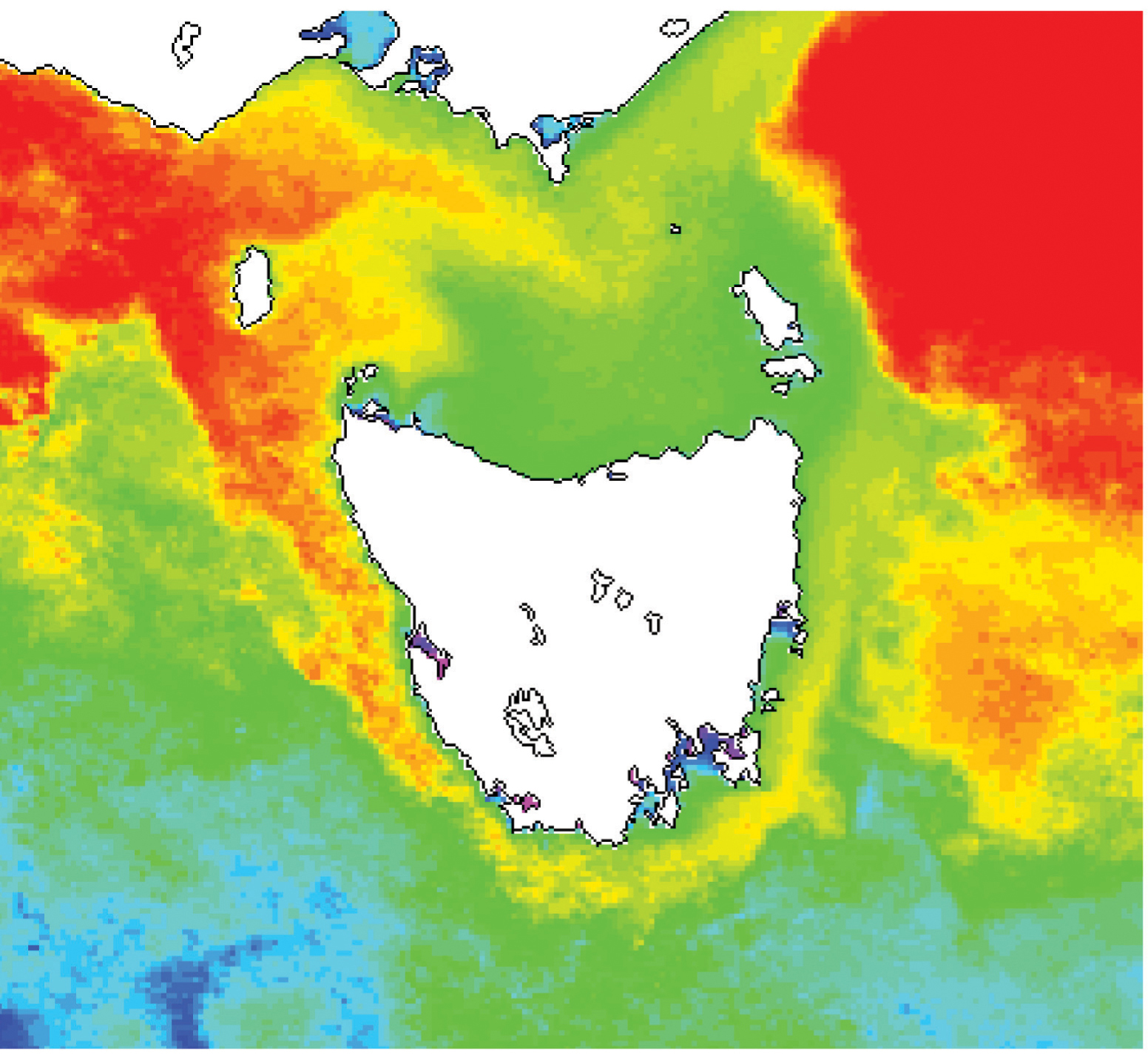
CSIRO NOAA polar orbiting satellites obtain the data generating sea surface temperature images. (Composite 15-day image showing the extension of the Leeuwin Current around Tasmania)

The East Australian Current (EAC) is a warm, southward, western boundary current that is formed from the South Equatorial Current (SEC) crossing the Coral Sea and reaching the eastern coast of Australia. At around 15° S near the Australian coast the SEC divides forming the southward flow of the EAC. It is the largest ocean current close to the shores of Australia.

== Behaviour ==
The EAC reaches a maximum velocity at 30° S, where its flow can reach 90 cm/s. As it flows southward it splits from the coast at around 31° to 32° S. By the time it reaches 33° S it begins to undergo a southward meander while another portion of the transport turns back northward in a tight recirculation. At this location the EAC reaches its maximum transport of nearly 35 Sv (35 billion liters per second).

The majority of the EAC flow that does not recirculate will move eastward into the Tasman Front, crossing the Tasman Sea just north of the cape of New Zealand. The remainder will flow south on the EAC Extension until it reaches the Antarctic Circumpolar Current. The Tasman Front transport is estimated at 13 Sv. The eastward movement of the EAC through the Tasman Front and reattachment to the coastline of New Zealand forms the East Auckland Current. The EAC also acts to transport tropical marine fauna to habitats in sub-tropical regions along the south east Australian coast. The current also warms up the eastern coastline of the country.

== Physical oceanography ==
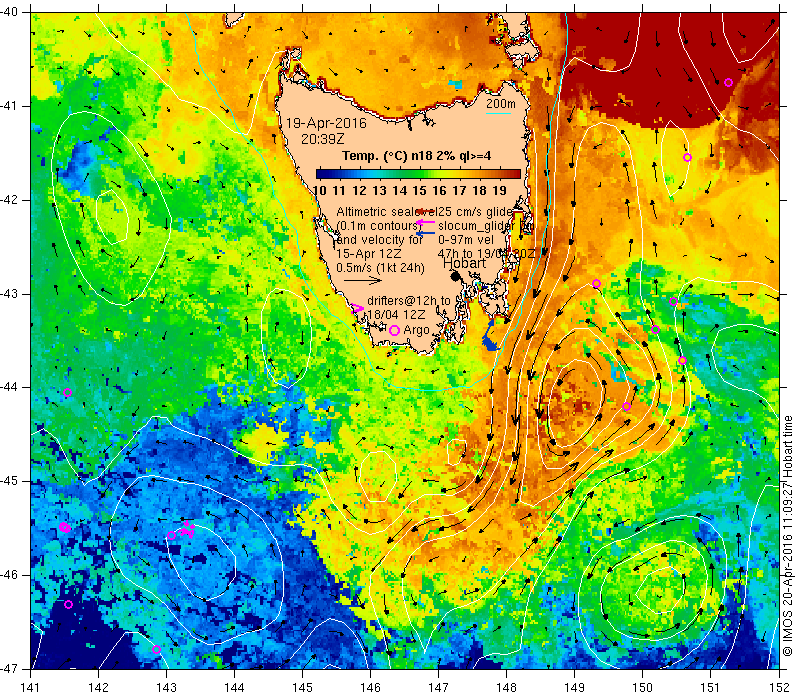
Heat flux in the East Australian Current from the equator toward the South Pole

The EAC is a surface current driven by winds over the South Pacific. These winds control how the current behaves at different times of year. The EAC starts on the west edge of the South Pacific Gyre where it collects warm, nutrient-poor water. As it skirts along the east coast of Australia, it carries a large amount of warm tropical water from the Equator southward. This contributes to the conditions which allow the Great Barrier Reef to thrive, keeping the east coast around 18 °C year round instead of dropping to 12 °C in the winter.

The current is very low in nutrients but remains important for the marine ecosystem. The EAC transfers heat from the tropics to the mid-latitude water and atmosphere. It does this by producing warm core eddies, which allow the Tasman Sea to have a large biodiversity. The most southern tip of the EAC can produce these eddies by wind currents. As instabilities in the current develop due to a westward Tasman Front, the meander pinches off to form eddies once or twice per year.

The EAC causes upwelling along the coastline. The eddies produced cause an increase in vertical mixing within the Tasman Sea. The process of producing, moving, and destroying eddies causes the thermocline layer to mix with the surface layer, bringing some nutrients up to the surface. The EAC and its eddies frequently flow onto the continental shelf and inshore, influencing circulation patterns and increasing mixing. Eddies are not the only way the EAC brings nutrients to the surface. Features along the coast push the current further offshore. If there is a strong northerly wind, it will push the current even further offshore, allowing deep water to rise up the coast, bringing nutrients up to the surface.

The EAC varies seasonally. It tends to be strongest in the summer, with a total flow of around 36.3 Sv. It is its weakest during the winter months, flowing at around 27.4 Sv. Over the past 50–60 years the EAC has shifted. The south Tasman Sea has become warmer and saltier from 1944–2002, causing the flow to strengthen and extend southward. This shift in the EAC flow past Tasmania is controlled by the Southern Hemisphere subtropical ocean circulation. This trend is thought to be caused by changes in wind patterns due to ozone depletion over Australia. There is a strong consensus with climate models that this trend will continue to intensify and accelerate over the next 100 years. The current is predicted to increase by more than 20%, due to the increase in South Pacific winds.

== In popular culture ==
In the 2003 Disney/Pixar animated film Finding Nemo, the EAC is portrayed as a superhighway that fish and sea turtles use to travel down the east coast of Australia. The characters Marlin (Albert Brooks) and Dory (Ellen DeGeneres) join Crush (Andrew Stanton), Squirt (Nicholas Bird) and a group of baby and adult sea turtles and fish in using the EAC to help them travel to Sydney Harbour to find his son Nemo (Alexander Gould). The basic premise of the storyline is actually correct. Every summer, thousands of fish are swept from the Great Barrier Reef to Sydney Harbour and further south; however, the current is not nearly as rapid as depicted in the film.

== See also ==
- Ocean current
- Oceanic gyres
- Physical oceanography
