= Tasman Sea =

Marginal sea of the South Pacific between Australia and New Zealand

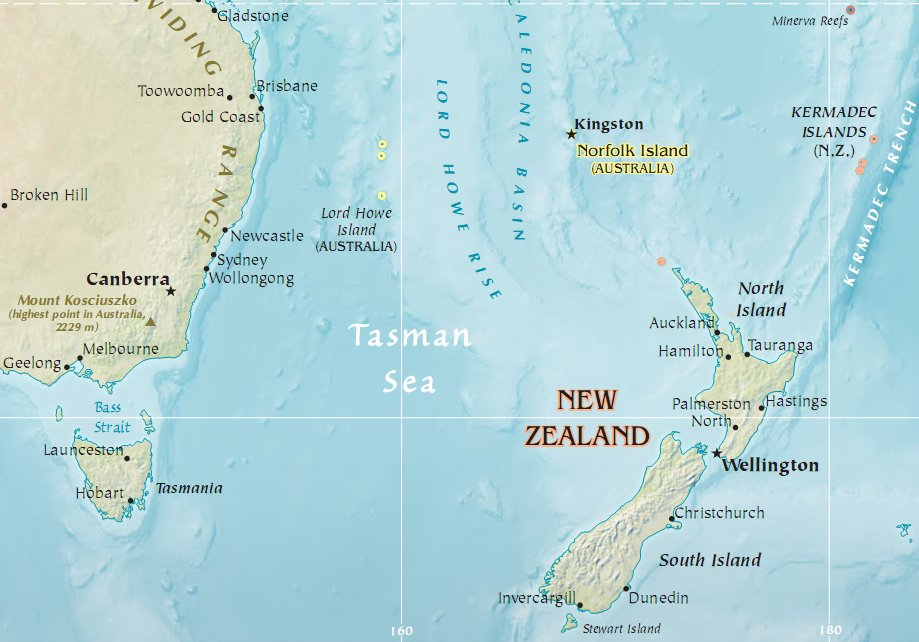
- Map of the Tasman Sea
- Location: Western Pacific Ocean (Oceania)
- Coordinates: 40°S 160°E
- Type: Sea
- Basin countries: Australia; New Zealand
- Max. length: 2,800 km (1,700 mi)
- Max. width: 2,200 km (1,400 mi)
- Surface area: 2,300,000 km^{2} (890,000 sq mi)
- Islands: Lord Howe Island; Norfolk Island
- Benches: Lord Howe Rise
- Settlements: Australia; Sydney; Newcastle; Central Coast; Wollongong; Hobart; Coffs Harbour; Port Macquarie; New Zealand; Auckland; Wellington; New Plymouth; Whanganui

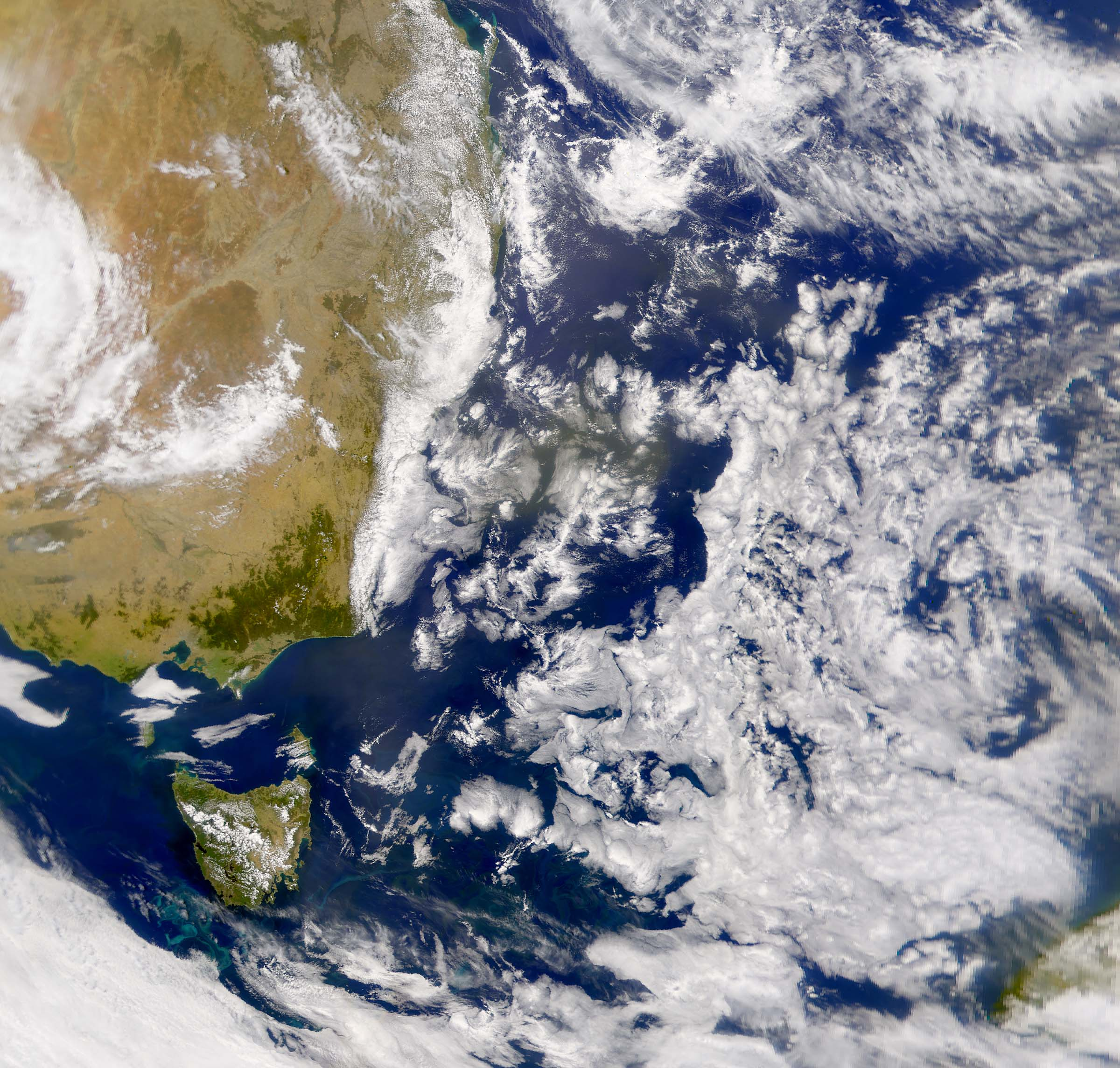
Satellite photo of the Tasman Sea

The Tasman Sea is a marginal sea of the South Pacific Ocean, situated between Australia and New Zealand. It measures about 2,000 km (1,200 mi) across and about 2,800 km (1,700 mi) from north to south. The sea was named after the Dutch explorer Abel Janszoon Tasman, who in 1642 was the first known European to cross it. British explorer Lieutenant James Cook later extensively navigated the Tasman Sea in the 1770s during his three voyages of exploration.

The Māori people of New Zealand call this sea Te Moana-a-Rehua meaning 'the sea of Rehua' which clashes with the Pacific waters named Te Tai-o-Whitirea ('the sea of Whitirea') – after Whitirea, Rehua's lover – at Cape Reinga, the northernmost tip of North Island.

== Climate ==
The south of the sea is passed over by depressions going from west to east. The northern limit of these westerly winds is near to 40°S. During the southern winter, from April to October, the northern branch of these winds from the west changes its direction toward the north and goes up against trade winds. Hence, the sea receives frequent winds from the southwest during this period. In the Australian summer (from November to March), the southern branch of the trade winds goes up against west winds and produces further wind activity in the area.

== Geography ==
The Tasman Sea is 2,250 km (1,400 mi) wide and has an area of 2,300,000 km^{2} (890,000 sq mi). The maximum depth of the sea is 5,943 m (19,498 ft). The base of the sea is made up of globigerina ooze. A small zone of pteropod ooze is found to the south of New Caledonia and to the southern extent of 30°S, siliceous ooze can be found.

=== Extent ===
The International Hydrographic Organization defines the limits of the Tasman Sea as:

On the West A line from Gabo Island (near Cape Howe, 37°30'S) to the northeast point of East Sister Island (148°E), thence along the 148th meridian to Flinders Island; beyond this island a line running to the eastward of the Vansittart Shoals to [Cape] Barren Island, and from Cape Barren (the easternmost point of [Cape] Barren Island) to Eddystone Point (41°S) in Tasmania, thence along the east coast to South East Cape, the southern point of Tasmania.

On the North The parallel of 30°S from the Australian coast eastward as far as a line joining the east extremities of Elizabeth Reef and South East Rock (31°47′S 159°18′E) then to the southward along this line to the South East Rock [an outlier of Lord Howe Island].

On the Northeast From the South East Rock to the north point of Three Kings Islands (34°10′S 172°10′E), thence to North Cape in New Zealand.

On the East

- In Cook Strait. A line joining the south extreme of the foul ground off Cape Palliser (Ngawi) and the Lighthouse on Cape Campbell (Te Karaka).
- In Foveaux Strait (46°45'S). A line joining the light on Waipapapa Point [sic] (168°33'E) with East Head (47'02'S) of Stewart Island (Rakiura).

On the Southeast A line running from South West Cape, Stewart Island, through the Snares (48°S, 166°30'E) to North West Cape, Auckland Island (50°30′S 166°10′E), through this island to its southern point.

On the South A line joining the southern point of Auckland Island (50°55′S 166°0′E) to South East Cape, the southern point of Tasmania.

=== Ridge ===
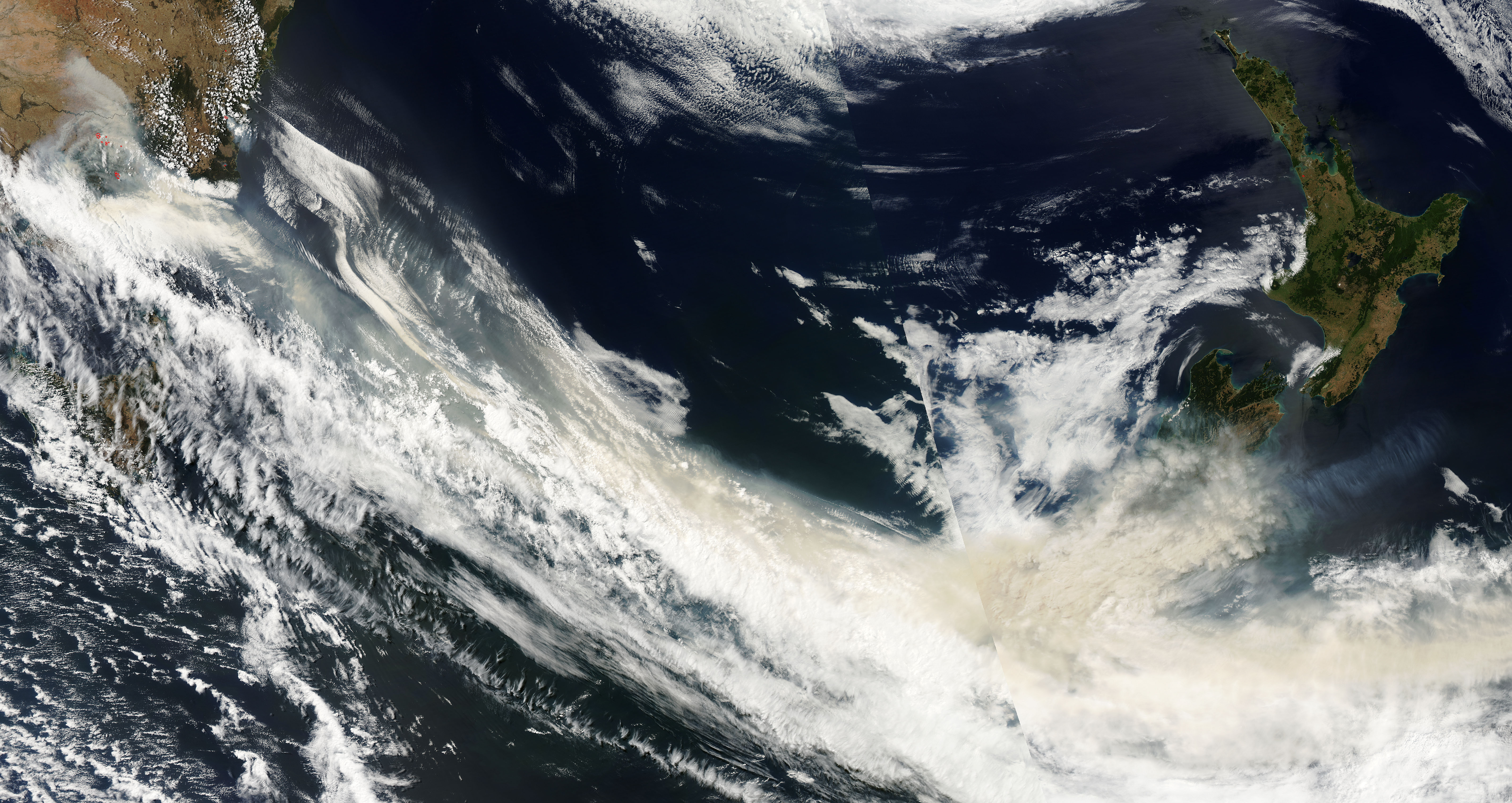
Smoke from the Black Saturday bushfires crosses the southern Tasman Sea

The Tasman Sea's midocean ridge developed between 85 and 55 million years ago as Australia and Zealandia broke apart during the breakup of supercontinent Gondwana. It lies roughly midway between the continental margins of Australia and Zealandia. Much of Zealandia is submerged, so the ridge runs much closer to the Australian coast than New Zealand's.

=== Islands ===
The Tasman Sea features a number of midsea island groups, quite apart from coastal islands located near the Australian and New Zealand mainlands:

- Lord Howe Island (part of New South Wales)
- Ball's Pyramid (part of New South Wales)

=== Adjoining bodies of water ===
- North: Coral Sea
- Northeast and East: Pacific Ocean
- East: Cook Strait
- South and southeast: Southern Ocean
- West: Bass Strait

== Currents ==
The East Australian Current that commences its flow southwards in the tropics of the Coral Sea, near the eastern coast of Australia is the most energetic circulation feature in the south western Pacific Ocean and is a primary means of heat transport from the tropics to the middle latitudes between Australia and New Zealand. The East Australian Current is a return of the westward-flowing Pacific Equatorial Current (Pacific South Equatorial Current). At the juncture between the Tasman and Coral seas while the East Australian Current continues south in the western Tasman a branch flows east called the Tasman Front towards the north of New Zealand with most continuing eastward above New Zealand into the South Pacific Ocean. It transpires that while predominantly the location of westerly wind stress is a factor in how far north the formation of the Tasman Front occurs, so is the presence of the New Zealand land mass, as the top of New Zealand defines the furtherest south that the Tasman Front can be split off by the westerly winds. A boundary current called the East Auckland Current goes down the west coast of the North Island and further south the East Cape Current, that has been diverted towards the South Island by the shapes of the Lord Howe Rise and southern east coast of the North island continues to the south. The East Australian Current south of Tasmania also is diverted west in the Subtropical Front which collides with the western moving Subantarctic front of the Antarctic Circumpolar Current. The East Australian Current sheds eddies on its way south that move south-westward with some known as the Tasman Leakage making it as far westward as the Indian Ocean.

== Animal and plant life ==
A deep-sea research ship, the RV Tangaroa, explored the sea and found 500 species of fish and 1300 species of invertebrates. The tooth of a megalodon, an extinct shark, was also found by researchers.

== History ==
In 1876, the first telegraph cable connecting Australia and New Zealand was laid in the Tasman Sea. The telegraph cable was made obsolete in 1963 when the Commonwealth Pacific Cable, New Zealand's first international telephone cable, was completed. Moncrieff and Hood were the first to attempt a trans-Tasman crossing by plane in January 1928. The aviators were never seen or heard of again. The first successful flight over the sea was accomplished by Charles Kingsford Smith and Charles Ulm later that year. The first person to row solo across the sea was Colin Quincey in 1977. The next successful solo crossing was completed by his son, Shaun Quincey, in 2010.

The Tasman Sea has for many years been referred to colloquially as "The Ditch" by Australians and New Zealanders. The exact etymology for this term is uncertain.

== See also ==
- Axis naval activity in New Zealand waters
- Tasman Abyssal Plain

== Sources ==
- Rotschi, H.; Lemasson, L. (1967), Oceanography of the Coral and Tasman Seas (PDF), Oceanogr Marine Biol Ann Rev, ASIN B00KJ0X6D4
