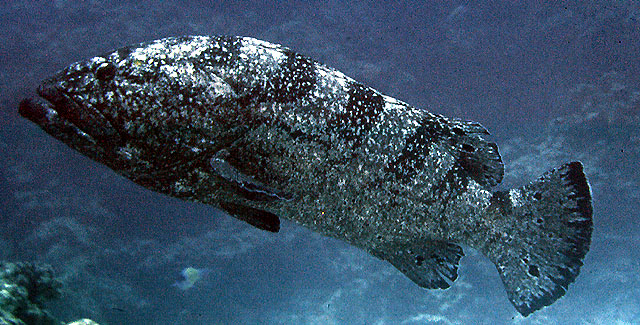
- Picture taken in Australia, Elizabeth Reef. Specimen is 40 cm (16 in) in total length.

Conservation status
- Near Threatened (IUCN 3.1)

Scientific classification
- Kingdom: Animalia
- Phylum: Chordata
- Class: Actinopterygii
- Division: Teleostei
- Order: Perciformes
- Family: Epinephelidae
- Genus: Epinephelus
- Species: E. daemelii

Binomial name
- Epinephelus daemelii (Günther, 1876)

Synonyms
- Serranus daemelii Günther, 1876; Epinephelus forsythi Whitley, 1937

= Saddletail grouper =

Species of fish

The saddletail grouper (Epinephelus daemelii), known as black cod or black rock-cod in their main range in Australia, and as saddle-tailed grouper or spotted black grouper in New Zealand, is a large marine fish of the family Serranidae. It is found off the coastline of southeastern Australia and northern New Zealand, generally inhabiting near-shore rock and coral reefs at depths down to 50 metres (160 ft). Its main range comprises the southeast coastline of Australia, in the state of New South Wales; New Zealand populations are suspected to be nonbreeding, so are a result of drifting larvae. However, spawning aggregations have been recorded off northern New Zealand.

This grouper grows to 200 cm (79 in) in length and at least 68 kg (150 lb) in weight. The species is a generalised carnivore, preying on crustaceans and fish. It has a typical grouper appearance. Colouration varies from a dark grey-black colour to the more usual blotched or banded black and white pattern.

The species is a protogynous hermaphrodite, with individuals starting as females and changing to males at an estimated 100–110 cm (39–43 in) in length and 29–30 years of age.

Drastic but localised declines in saddletail grouper stocks due to line fishing were first noted around heavily populated areas in the early 1900s. However, in the 1950s, 1960s and 1970s, E. daemelii populations suffered a severe decline due to the rise in popularity of spear fishing. Due to the species' large size, slowness, curiosity, territorial habits, and use of inshore habitats, it was extremely vulnerable to spear fishing. The species was heavily targeted by spear fishermen and caught in large quantities. After more than two decades of severe spear fishing-driven decline, the New South Wales fishery department belatedly banned the spearing or taking of black cod in 1983, and subsequently listed the species as vulnerable under New South Wales fisheries legislation. The Australian Government listed it as vulnerable under national environmental legislation in 2012.
