= Gay separatism =

Support of gay men's separation from society

Two interlocked Mars symbols representing male homosexuality.

Gay separatism is the political belief in and advocacy for gay male separatism. Separatism for gay men has included explicit political calls for men-only spaces; the creation of communes for gay men; and the lived social practice of self-segregation in "gayborhoods."

== Opposition ==
In the 1960s, prominent gay men opposed gay separatism. The poet W. H. Auden refused to allow his poems to be included in specifically gay anthologies and once stated, "I'm no advocate of the purely Uranian society myself. I mean, I certainly don't want to live only with queers."

== Gender separatism ==
By the 1970s' United States, homosexual organizations split along gender lines. Lesbian-only organizations, such as The Furies, and lesbian separatist literature — such as Lesbian Nation and Dykes & Gorgons — advocated for a complete separation of lesbians and gay men.

Gay separatist organizations emerged at this same time. Lee Craig Schoonmaker, a longtime activist and coiner of the "pride" slogan, was a gay separatist, opposing both bisexual inclusion and gender-integration. In 1969, he founded an organization called Homosexuals Intransigent! — which allowed only gay men as members. Schoonmaker called women "restricting" and stated "there is no reason whatever for their inclusion."

In 1979, at the National March on Washington for Lesbian and Gay Rights, Homosexuals Intransigent! distributed gay separatist literature, entitled "Messages on the Occasion of the Washington March, October 14, 1979." In the pamphlet of short writings, members of the organization advocated for gay men to live and organize separately from both straight and gay women, stating, "The time has come for a homosexual Declaration of Independence from women — all women."

== Gay communalism ==
During the hippie movement in the United States, some gay men experimented with gay separatism through the creation of communes. Many of these back-to-the-land projects were led by white gay men who were interested in fusing their sexual politics with their ecofeminist, animist, and countercultural spiritual beliefs.

One such organization, the Radical Faeries, was founded in order to reject hetero-imitation. The Faeries focused on the particular spiritual experience of man-loving men (MLM) by co-creating temporary autonomous zones. Faerie "sanctuaries" adapted rural living and environmentally sustainable ways of using modern technologies as part of creative expression. The Faeries rejected the capitalistic and patriarchal aspects of LGBTQ+ life while celebrating eclectic constructs and rituals.

== Impact of the AIDS Crisis ==
LGBT historians argue the devastation of the 1980s AIDS crisis reshaped the development of gay and lesbian separatist politics. Historian Douglas Crimp writes, "The AIDS crisis [brought] us face-to-face with the consequences of our separatism."

Sarah Schulman, another LGBT historian, argues gay separatism in the 1970s emerged as a response to the economic oppression of gay men. Schulman writes, "Gay men were a highly oppressed community at this time... [and] resented that they could not access the full rights and privileges of men." According to Schulman, however, the political coalitions and personal connections built during the AIDS crisis resulted in many gay men being "finally free to love women, to learn from women, and to listen to women."

By 1995, however, the writer Pat Califia identified a "resurgence" of gay separatism, noting that in the aftermath of the AIDS crisis, the death of spaces dedicated solely to gay men represented a "threat" to their identity. In the following decades, a significant number of campgrounds and cruises emerged to cater exclusively to gay men.

== In fiction ==
In limited instances, gay separatism has been represented through single-gender worlds in utopian fiction.

In the 2nd century CE, Lucian of Samosata tells in his fictional work A True Story that the inhabitants of the Moon, the Selenitans, are all males, completely unaware of the female gender. As adults they marry man to man and have children, always male, begotten in their legs, in the manner of Zeus begetting Dionysus in his thigh. There are a kind of men among them called Dendritans, who generate children by cutting and planting the right testicle in the earth, from which a flesh tree grows bearing a fruit the size of a cubit, from which the baby son is harvested.

When overpopulation drives the world away from heterosexuality in Charles Beaumont's short story "The Crooked Man" (1955), first published in Playboy, homosexuals begin to oppress the heterosexual minority.

In Anthony Burgess's The Wanting Seed (1962), there is active discrimination against heterosexuals, homosexuality being encouraged as a measure against overpopulation.

A. Bertram Chandler's A Spartan Planet (1969) features the men-only planet Sparta, in which human beings are produced by birth machines — women are unknown, and the society is dedicated to the values of militarism loosely modeled upon the ancient Greek city state of Sparta. Male homosexuality is the norm, and the protagonist, policeman Brasidus, has a partner named Achron, a male crechè nurse.

In Moto Hagio's 1985 yaoi manga Marginal, on a future Earth a biochemical apocalypse has made women extinct, and, for centuries, the all-male population of Earth has survived by depending on only one woman, whose ova are harvested to create genetically engineered children (only boys). By the year 2999, society has restructured itself into clans and villages of all-male families and partnerships.

Ethan of Athos (1986) by Lois Bujold, inspired by the real world men-only religious society of Mount Athos, shows a world in which men have isolated their planet from the rest of civilization to avoid the "corrupting" effect of women. Children are grown in uterine replicators, using ova derived from tissue cultures; the novel's plot is driven by the declining fertility of these cultures. The titular "unlikely hero" is gay obstetrician Dr. Ethan Urquhart, whose dangerous adventure alongside the first woman he has ever met presents both a future society where homosexuality is the norm and the lingering sexism and homophobia of our own world.

The parodic film Gayniggers from Outer Space (1992) follows a group of intergalactic homosexual black men as they exterminate the female population of the Earth, eventually creating a utopic gay male-only world.

The 2005 novel This Gay Utopia by John Butler imagines male-only spaces in a small town in which both straight and gay men engage in homosexual relations.

Rafael Grugman's dystopian novel Nontraditional Love (2008) describes an inverted world in which mixed-sex marriages are forbidden and conception occurs in test tubes. In lesbian families, one of the women carries the child while gay male couples turn to surrogate mothers to bring their children to term. The Netherlands is the only country where mixed-sex marriages are permitted. In this world intimacy between the opposite sexes is rejected, world history and the classics of world literature have been falsified in order to support the ideology of the homosexual world. The author paints a grotesque situation, but underlying this story is the idea that society should be tolerant and accepting and respect the right of every person to be themselves.

The gay fantasy book series Regelance (2012) by J. L. Langley depicts a world where men are able to reproduce via replicative technology. While there are still women amongst the lower classes, who reproduce in the traditional manner, there are none among the upper classes which the series focuses on.

The 2018 manga and its 2021 live-action television drama adaptation A Man Who Defies the World of BL follows an average male college student who discovers that he is living inside a "world of BL", finding himself surrounded by boys whose sole purpose in life seems to be to fall in love with each other.

In Fudanshi Shōkan (2019–present), university student Kotone Aizuhara is a fudanshi, an avid male fan of boys' love manga. During a visit to a bookstore, a truck crashes into a book stand and Kotone apparently dies buried under a pile of BL books. When he wakes up, he finds himself in an alternate world with no women, where the sacred snake beast, Nagi, takes him as his bridegroom.

Several writers and scholars have identified literary and dramatic depictions of gay male utopias. According to writer Brian Hu, since every character in the 2004 Taiwanese film Formula 17 is a gay man, the film's cinematic world should be interpreted as a gay male utopia. In 2017, the American historian Tavia Nyong'o described the play Future St. as depicting a gay male utopia. Finally, the Sri Lankan writer Mary Anne Mohanraj identified the 1971 novel The Wild Boys as a gay male utopia.

According to scholar Anette Myrestøl Espelid, male separatist literature is less common than female separatist fiction because many "books written about wars or adventure stories almost exclusively feature men only, and as women were excluded from taking part in the public sphere up until fairly recent times, there is hardly any need for men to imagine a world without women."

== See also ==
- Queer nationalism
