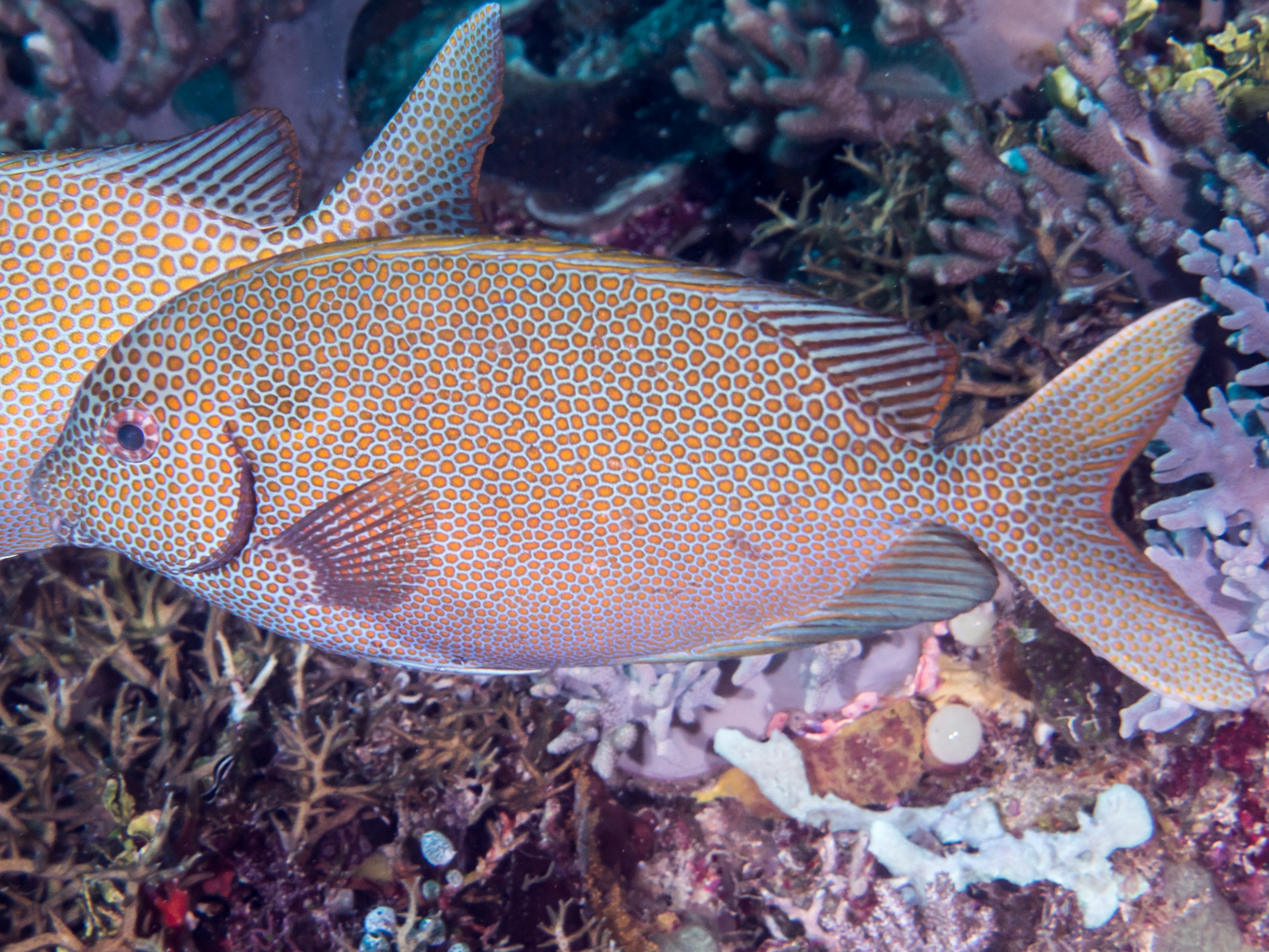

Conservation status
- Least Concern (IUCN 3.1)

Scientific classification
- Kingdom: Animalia
- Phylum: Chordata
- Class: Actinopterygii
- Order: Acanthuriformes
- Family: Siganidae
- Genus: Siganus
- Species: S. punctatus

Binomial name
- Siganus punctatus (Schneider & Forster, 1801)

Synonyms
- List: Amphacanthus punctatus Schneider & Forster, 1801; Teuthis punctata (Schneider & Forster, 1801); Teuthis punctatus (Schneider & Forster, 1801); Siganus fuscus Griffith & C.H. Smith, 1834; Harpurus inermis Forster, 1844; Amphacanthus chrysospilos Bleeker, 1852; Siganus chrysospilos (Bleeker, 1852); Siganus chrysospilus (Bleeker, 1852); Teuthis chrysospilus (Bleeker, 1852); Amphacanthus hexagonatus Bleeker, 1854; Siganus hexagonata (Bleeker, 1854); Teuthis hexagonata (Bleeker, 1854); Teuthis hexagonatus (Bleeker, 1854); Amphacanthus melanospilos Bleeker, 1855; Siganus capricornensis Whitley, 1926; Amphacanthus capricornensis (Whitley, 1926)

= Siganus punctatus =

Species of fish

Siganus punctatus the goldspotted spinefoot, goldspotted rabbitfish, punctuated spinefoot, spotted rabbitfish, spotted spinefoot or yellow-spotted spinefoot, is a species of marine ray-finned fish, a rabbitfish belonging to the family Siganidae. It occurs in the Indo-West Pacific region.

== Taxonomy ==
Siganus punctatus was first formally described in 1801 as Amphacanthus punctatus by Johann Gottlob Theaenus Schneider and Johann Reinhold Forster with the type locality given as Nomuka Island in the Ha'apai Group of Tonga. The specific name punctatus means "spotted", a reference to the golden spots on the head, body and tail.

== Description ==
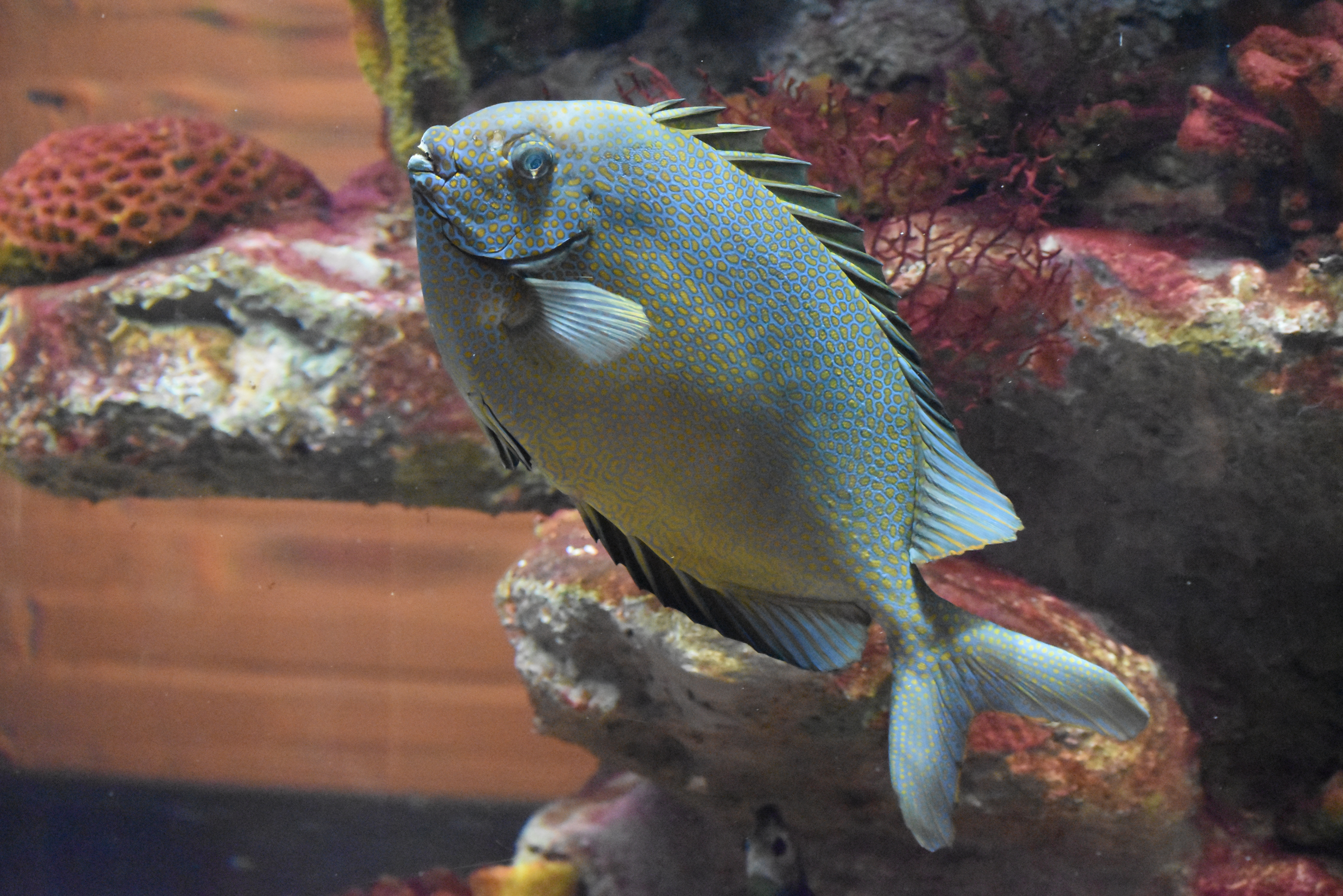
At the Cleveland Aquarium

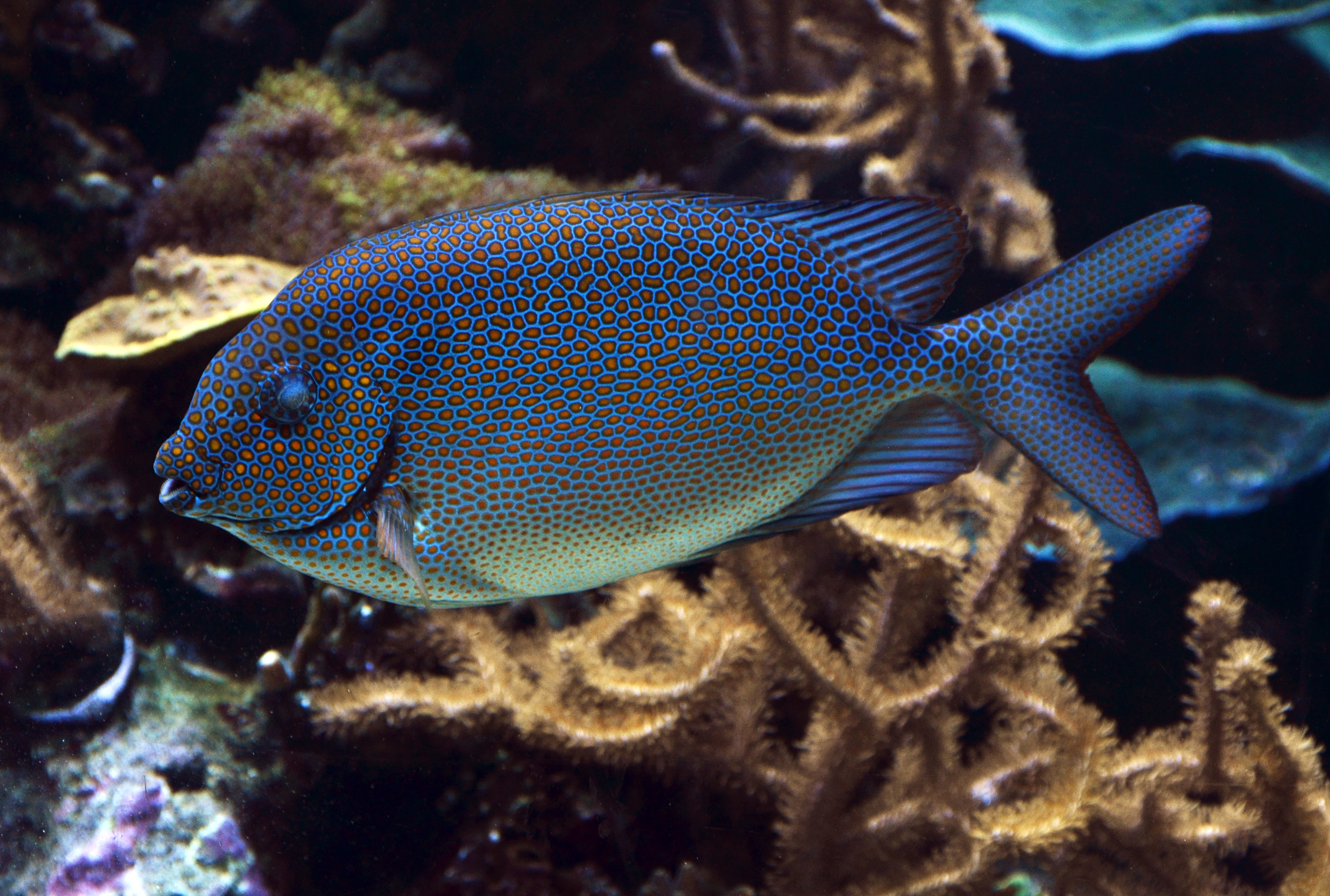
In an aquarium

Siganus punctatus has a laterally compressed, deep body which has a depth which fits into its standard length between 1.9 and 2.3 times. The head has a straight dorsal profile, it runs from the forehead to the snout at an angle of 45°, while the ventral profile is slightly indented underneath the chin. In fish of less than 13 cm (5.1 in) standard length the front nostril has a flap extending half-way to the rear nostril, this flap is reduced to a low rim with a relict posterior peak once the standard length has reached 15 cm (5.9 in). A recumbent spine is to the front of the dorsal fin, it is imbedded in the nape. Like all rabbitfishes, the dorsal fin has 13 spines and 10 soft rays while the anal fin has 7 spines and 9 soft rays. The fin spines are robust and hold venom glands. The caudal fin is emarginate in individuals with a standard length of less than 13 cm (5.1 in) as the fish grows it slowly changes to become deeply forked with the tips of the lobes broadly rounded. This species attains a maximum total length of 40 cm (16 in), although 30 cm (12 in) is more typical. The overall colour is greyish with a dense pattern of brown spots with darker margins over the head, body and fins. There is sometimes a pale saddle on the caudal peduncle and a large ocellus to the rear of the upper margin of the gill cover. The spots on juveniles are fewer in number and larger in size. There is frequently a very narrow yellow margin to the caudal fin.

== Distribution and habitat ==
Siganus punctatus has a wide Indo-West Pacific distribution extending from the Cocos (Keeling) Islands in the eastern Indian Ocean east to Samoa, north to Ryukyu and Ogasawara Islands of Japan and south to Australia. In Australia its range runs from Rottnest Island in Western Australia north and east along the northern tropical coast and then south on the east coast as far as North West Solitary Island in New South Wales, it is also found at Rowley Shoals and Scott Reef off Western Australia, the Ashmore Reef in the Timor Sea and in the Coral Sea at Coringa-Herald Cays and Lihou Reef. It occurs down to 40 m (130 ft) in depth in clear lagoons and on seaward reefs as adults while the juveniles school in estuaries.

== Biology ==
Siganus punctatus live in pairs on reefs as adults while the juveniles aggregate in schools of up to 50 fish, the size of the schools decline as the fish mature and they begin to pair off once they have attained a standard length of around 15 cm (5.9 in), but fish as large as 22 cm (8.7 in) may still be in schools. They feed on benthic algae. This species produces venom in the spines of its fins. In a study of the venom of a congener it was found that rabbitfish venom was similar to the venom of stonefishes.

== Utilisation ==
Siganus punctatus is caught by spearfishing or in fish traps and the catch is sold as fresh fish. It is occasionally found in the aquarium trade.
