= Gay and Lesbian Kingdom of the Coral Sea Islands =

2004–17 putative micronation in Australia

Gay & Lesbian Kingdom of the Coral Sea Islands
- Micronation (unrecognised entity)
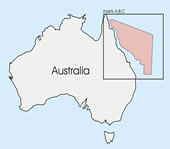
- Claimed territory of the kingdom
- Location: Coral Sea Islands Territory
- Dates claimed: 14 June 2004–17 November 2017

The Gay and Lesbian Kingdom of the Coral Sea Islands (also known as the Gay Kingdom of the Coral Sea) was a putative micronation established as a symbolic political protest by a group of gay rights activists based in Australia. Declared in June 2004 in response to the introduction of a government bill to the Australian Parliament in May 2004 (which later passed in September that year) that codified the heterosexual definition of marriage, the Kingdom was founded on Australia's external overseas territory of the Coral Sea Islands, a group of uninhabited islets east of the Great Barrier Reef. The Kingdom was dissolved on 17 November 2017 following the "Yes" vote in the Australian Marriage Law Postal Survey legalising same-sex marriage.

The Coral Sea Islands Territory is an external territory of Australia which comprises a group of small and mostly uninhabited tropical islands and reefs in the Coral Sea, northeast of Queensland, Australia. The territory covers 780,000 km^{2} (301,160 sq mi), most of which is ocean, extending east and south from the outer edge of the Great Barrier Reef; it includes Heralds Beacon Island, Osprey Reef, the Willis Group as well as fifteen other reef and island groups. Cato Island is the highest point in the Territory and a camp site on the island called Heaven was the claimed capital of the Gay and Lesbian Kingdom of the Coral Sea Islands.

== History of the Coral Sea Islands ==
The Coral Sea Islands were first charted in 1803. In the 1870s and 1880s the islands were mined for guano but the absence of a reliable supply of fresh water prevented long-term habitation. The Coral Sea Islands became an Australian external territory in 1969 by the Coral Sea Islands Act (prior to that, the area was considered part of Queensland) and extended in 1997 to include Elizabeth Reef and Middleton Reef nearly 800 km further south, in the Tasman Sea.

The two latter reefs are much closer to Lord Howe Island, New South Wales, (about 150 km (93 mi)) than to the southernmost island of the rest of the territory, Cato Island. The islands, cays and reefs of the Great Barrier Reef are not part of the territory, belonging to Queensland instead. The outer edge of the Great Barrier Reef is the boundary between Queensland and the Coral Sea Islands Territory.

== Founding of the kingdom ==
The initiative for the founding of a gay kingdom was taken during the Brisbane Gay and Lesbian Pride Festival in 2003. Gay activists believed that change in the marriage law, in particular the government's plan to amend the marriage act so as to prevent homosexual couples who were married overseas to have their relationship recognised, had taken from homosexual people the right to be treated equally, "whether it be marriage, superannuation, hospital visits, adoption or IVF treatments".

Based on the law of "Unjust Enrichment" ("If something is unjustly taken compensation must be made") and with reference to international law, which states "Oppressed people of overseas territories have a right to self government and self determination", the activists claimed "territorial compensation" by establishing an independent gay state, claiming The Coral Sea Islands as its territory.

== Declaration of independence ==
On 14 June 2004, after sailing on a ship named the Gayflower (a reference to the Mayflower), the activists raised the gay rainbow pride flag on Cato Island, and declared the Coral Sea Islands an independent gay and lesbian state. A memorial plaque on the north eastern tip of Cato Island commemorates this historic event and reads:

"On the 14th day of June 2004, at this highest point in the Coral Sea, Emperor Dale Parker Anderson raised the gay rainbow flag and claimed the islands of the Coral Sea in his name as homeland for the gay and lesbian peoples of the world. God Save our King!"

Coinciding with the decision to secede from Australian sovereignty, the kingdom's founders drafted a declaration of independence. The declaration began,

"Homosexual people have honestly endeavoured everywhere to merge ourselves in the social life of surrounding communities and to be treated equally. We are not permitted to do so. In vain we are loyal patriots, our loyalty in some places running to extremes; in vain do we make the same sacrifices of life and property as our fellow citizens; in vain do we strive to increase the fame of our native land in science and art, or her wealth by trade and commerce. In countries where we have lived for centuries, we are still cried down as strangers.... In the world as it is now and for an indefinite period.... I think we shall not be left in peace".

Stated to have been inspired by the United States Declaration of Independence, the kingdom's Declaration also stated: "We hold these truths to be self-evident, that all people are created equal, that they are endowed by their creator with certain unalienable rights, that among these are life, liberty and the pursuit of happiness".

The activists founded a camp site on Cato Island which they named "Heaven" after the famous gay nightclub in London as its claimed capital, and "I Am What I Am" was set as the Kingdom's national anthem.

The leader of the protesters, Dale Parker Anderson, was elected Administrator of the territory and then "declared emperor" of the kingdom upon its independence.

In a scheme similar to Israel's Law of Return, a person was automatically granted permanent resident status and immediately eligible for citizenship in the Gay and Lesbian Kingdom of the Coral Sea Islands simply by being gay or lesbian.

Set of nine stamps from the GLK

The kingdom issued its first stamps in July 2006 "with the aim of creating a high and distinctive reputation amongst the philatelic fraternity". The kingdom's website stated that tourism, fishing and philatelic sales were its only economic activities. However, swimming, reef walking, lagoon snorkelling, bird-watching, seashell-collecting, and shipwreck-exploring were all gay government-sanctioned non-economic activities.

== International relations ==
Other than the protester inhabitants, the islands of the Coral Sea Islands Territory were uninhabited and the kingdom's independence was not recognised by Australia or any world government. The Coral Sea Islands continued to be recognised as an external overseas Territory of Australia by the United Nations. On 13 September 2004, the Gay Kingdom declared war on Australia.

In May 2010, Dale Anderson was invited to (but did not attend) a conference in Sydney for the leaders of all the micronations in the world, in order to determine ways to obtain recognition as sovereign countries. The Gay Government announced that the Emperor would not be attending the conference on the grounds that the Gay and Lesbian Kingdom of the Coral Sea Islands being a former overseas external Territory of Australia was not a micronation.

On 28 February 2017, Liberal Senator Eric Abetz objected to the rainbow flag being displayed in the Department of Finance on the grounds that government departments should take a neutral stand on political debates. He concluded his comments with an incidental observation by identifying:

"...[T]his particular flag is the flag of the Gay and Lesbian Kingdom of the Coral Sea Islands, which has declared war on Australia. Senator Cormann, you would understand they did the same as Prince Leonard of the Principality of Hutt River and this is now their official flag. It is the flag of a hostile nation, if we are to believe them, having declared war on Australia..."

Cormann agreed, affirming that "We will make sure that there are no flags of hostile nations anywhere in any government building".

== Dissolution ==
In late 2016, the official website of the Gay and Lesbian Kingdom of the Coral Sea Islands added a link to point viewers to the website of The Equality Campaign, the organisation which called on Australian voters to participate in the Australian Marriage Law Postal Survey, in which a "yes" vote likely would prompt the Parliament of Australia to enact same-sex marriage.

Following the decision made by the Australian Government to legalise same-sex marriage, the Kingdom was dissolved on 17 November 2017.

== See also ==
- Timeline of LGBTQ history
- Queer nationalism
- Coral Sea Islands
- Rainbow flag (LGBTQ)
