= Single gender =

Single gender may refer to:

- single-gender world, a fictional society in which only one gender exists
- sex segregation, the practice of only allowing members of one particular gender into an institution
- gonochorism, a system where individuals have a specific gender
