= Queer nationalism =

Idea that the LGBTQ community is a nation in and of itself

Queer nationalism is a phenomenon related both to the gay and lesbian liberation movement and nationalism. Adherents of this movement support the notion that the LGBTQ community forms a distinct people due to their unique culture and customs.

== History ==
In 1969, gay activist Don Jackson from California proposed to take over Alpine County, California—a project also known as Stonewall Nation.

=== Queer Nation ===
Homophobia in many cultures has led some queer people to become increasingly frustrated and wish to separate from a perceived hostile heterosexual majority. In 1990, prompted by these feelings, Queer Nation was founded, a radical organization best known for its slogan "We're here. We're queer. Get used to it".

=== 2004 — Gay and Lesbian Commonwealth Kingdom ===
In 2004, a group of Australian gay activists declared the tiny islands of Cato Reef to be the Gay and Lesbian Kingdom of the Coral Sea Islands and Dale Parker Anderson to be the Emperor. Following disagreements within the group in 2005, the Gay and Lesbian Commonwealth Kingdom and Unified Gay Tribe have cancelled their affiliation to Anderson.

Some other groups with similar causes exist, e.g. the Gay Homeland Foundation and a micronation called Gay Parallel Republic.

=== 2007 — Gay State ===
In 2007, Garrett Graham published a plan and constitution for a gay state, inspired by Theodor Herzl's Jewish state: "Herzl's words, messages and concepts live on in...The Gay State".

== Cultural identity ==
In his article "Social Movements as Nationalisms, or, On the Very Idea of a Queer Nation", Brian Walker points out that several features of the nationalistic creation of cultural identity apply to the LGBTQ national movement as well. He classifies queer nationalism as one of the new cultural forms of nationalism which are distinct from the old ethnic and religious types of nationalism and concludes that the gay and lesbian community fulfils many criteria to be regarded as a people for the following reasons:

- All forms of nationalism began as social movements, which queer nationalism is—a group of people set apart from those around them by in-group attitudes and discrimination from others.
- The gay community has a culture, with distinct discussion groups, book stores, magazines, bars, cabarets and other such features.
- It possesses a shared history and literature.

Walker regards modern communication technologies such as the Internet as offering a chance for the LGBT community to further integrate as a non-territorial nation.

This thesis is supported by Paul Treanor, who considers an alternative (non-nationalist) world order possible. In this context, Treanor mentions the LGBTQ community as a "non-territorial nationalist movement".

Will Kymlicka acknowledges that LGBTQ people have developed a group identity and group culture similar to those of ethnocultural groups, but he argues in favor of integration instead of separatism.

== Contemporary context ==
In the 2020s, the intersection of nationalism and LGBTQ rights has become increasingly pronounced globally. Governments in Hungary, Russia, and several other countries have framed restrictions on LGBTQ visibility as a defence of national values and identity — effectively using anti-LGBTQ legislation as a tool of nationalist politics. In 2025, seven countries in Europe enacted or proposed so-called "LGBT propaganda" laws, criminalising visibility and restricting discussion of LGBTQI issues in education.

Scholars have analysed this as a form of "weaponisation" of LGBTQ+ rights in geopolitics — where both pro-LGBTQ and anti-LGBTQ stances are mobilised to define national identity and demarcate civilisational boundaries.

== Queer anti-nationalism ==
Some scholars have positioned queer theory as fundamentally incompatible with nationalism, arguing that the nation-state is a heteronormative construct. Research on LGBTQ+ immigrants has shown that queer migrants often develop critical perspectives on national belonging, negotiating their attachment to states through their sexuality and in some cases formulating alternative, non-national forms of community and belonging.

== See also ==
- Gay separatism
- Gay village
- Homonationalism
- Identity politics
- Lesbian separatism
- Political lesbianism
