= Coral Sea Reserves Ramsar Site =

Marine nature reserve off Australia

Coordinates: 17°04′S 150°39′E

Designations

Ramsar Wetland
- Official name: Coral Sea Reserves
- Designated: 21 October 2002
- Reference no.: 1222

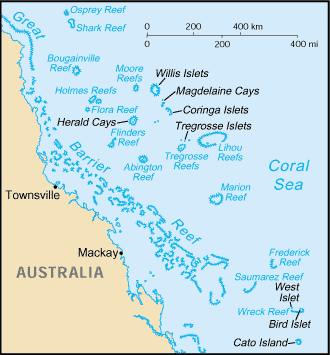
The Coringa Islets and the Magdelaine and Herald Cays, as well as those of Lihou Reef, lie within the Coral Sea Reserves Ramsar Site

The Coral Sea Reserves Ramsar Site comprises the 17,289 km^{2} of oceanic island and reef habitats within the former Coringa-Herald National Nature Reserve and the former Lihou Reef National Nature Reserve in the Australian Coral Sea Islands Territory.

== History ==
The existence of the islands and cays within the two reserves has been known to navigators since the early nineteenth century. Lihou Reef was named after Captain John Lihou of HMS Zenobia, who discovered the reef and its cays in 1823. The Coringa Islets were named after the cargo ship Coringa Packet, which foundered off Chilcott Islet in 1845. The Herald Cays were named after HMS Herald, which conducted hydrographic surveys in the Coral Sea, under the captaincy of Henry Mangles Denham, from 1849 to 1861.

During the 1960s many of the islands and reefs in the Territory were visited by scientific survey parties. Following an assessment of the conservation status of the islands and reefs, and recommendations for the total protection of a sample of islands in the Coral Sea, eventually the two reserves were proclaimed on 16 August 1982. Since then many further surveys have been conducted, including a multi-disciplinary scientific expedition by the Royal Geographical Society of Queensland which visited the Herald Cays and their surrounding reef in 1997.

The site was designated as a wetland of international importance under the Ramsar Convention on Wetlands. It was listed on 21 October 2002 as Ramsar Site 1222.

== Description ==
The site is centred on the Coral Sea Plateau, about 440 km east of Cairns, Queensland, and east of the Great Barrier Reef, from which it is separated by an area of deep water known as the Queensland Trough. Lihou Reef NNR lies to the south-east of the Coringa-Herald NNR and is separated from it by about 100 km of open sea.

The key conservation values of the site, as listed in the reserves’ management plan are the:

- near pristine marine ecosystems that have been protected from human-induced impacts, including marine pollution, by their isolation from the mainland;
- regionally representative examples of rich, shelf-edge oceanic reef;
- internationally significant populations of breeding seabirds, including migratory species listed under international agreements;
- undisturbed and important habitat for nesting green sea turtles, Chelonia mydas;
- Pisonia grandis forest ecosystem, which is relatively uncommon within Australia and has been subject to widespread destruction and disturbance throughout most of its Indo-Pacific distribution;
- diversity and abundance of marine sponges, which in places form spectacular sponge gardens; and
- fish and decapod crustacean fauna that is distinct from that of the Great Barrier Reef.

== Flora and fauna ==
Several of the site’s 24 islets provide undisturbed sandy beach habitat for nesting green sea turtles and habitat for hawksbill sea turtles, as well as forest and shrubland that support breeding populations of terns and other seabirds. Its coral reefs support a distinct community of marine benthic plants and animals, a diverse decapod crustacean and hydroid fauna, and feeding habitat for migratory shorebirds and seabirds. Seaweed communities are also important. There are no known native terrestrial mammals within the Reserves; introduced black rats were present on South West Coringa Islet for many years, but were eliminated by 1991 after an eradication program.

=== Birds ===
There are three non-colonial waterbirds that breed at the site, the eastern reef egret, Western swamphen and buff-banded rail. Among the 14 species of seabird recorded as breeding in the site are the lesser frigatebird, great frigatebird, red-footed booby, brown booby, masked booby, black noddy and red-tailed tropicbird.

== Access and usage ==
The large number of shipwrecks within the area give it marine archaeological significance. There is no resident human population; the site is used principally for nature conservation and scientific research. The reserves are internationally renowned for diving, snorkeling and bird watching. Access by commercial tour groups is regulated and limited, though there is some visitation by private yachts.
