= Flinders Reef (Coral Sea) =

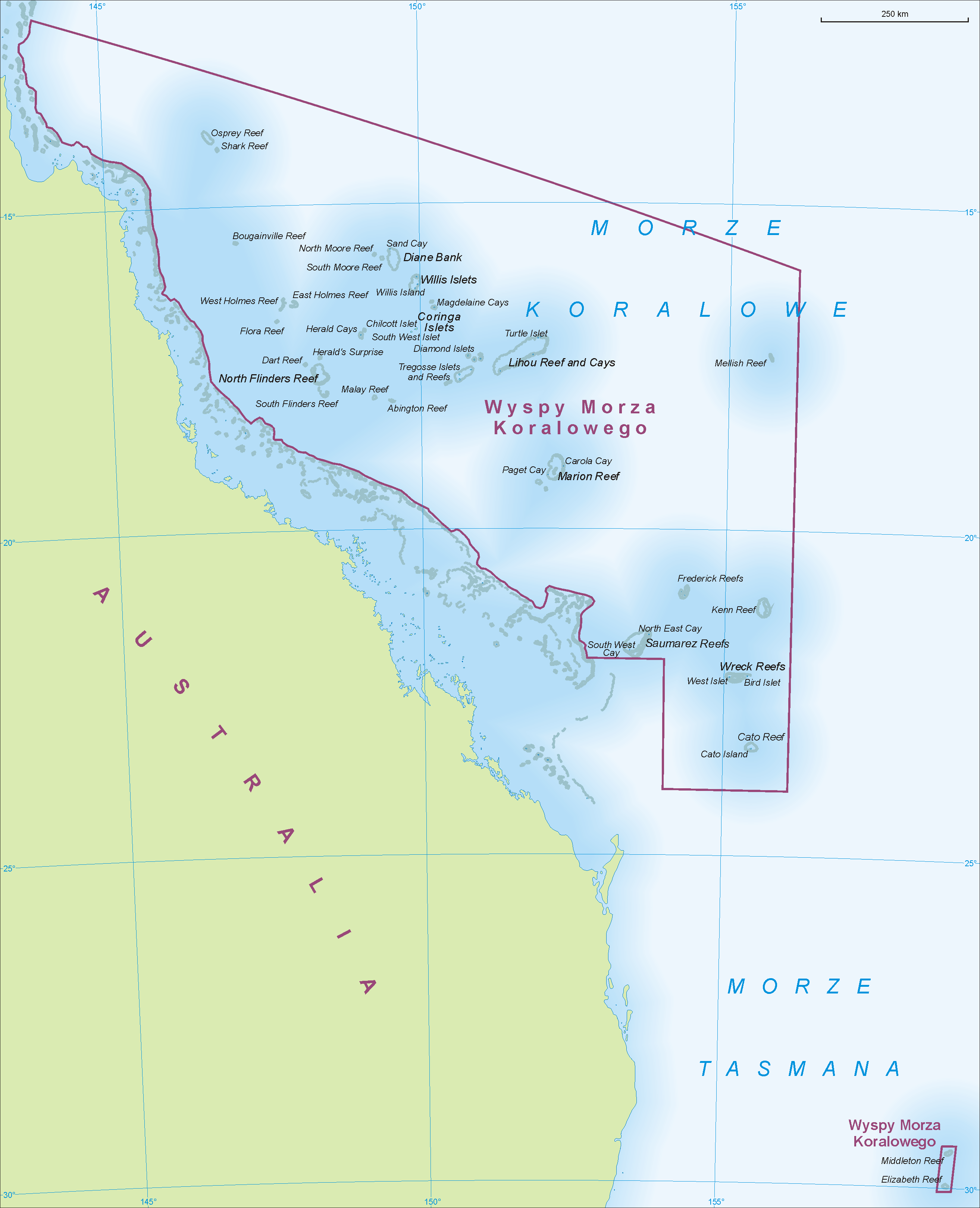
Flinders Reef lies within the Coral Sea Islands Territory.

Flinders Reef or Flinders Reefs is an isolated oceanic coral reef in the Coral Sea of the western Pacific Ocean . It lies east of Australia and the extensive Great Barrier Reef. Due to its remote location, it remains poorly studied. However, this isolation has also made it a potential site to mark the beginning of the Anthropocene.

The main reef is sometimes referred to as North Flinders Reefs, distinguishing it from a smaller reef immediately to its south sometimes called South Flinders Reefs.

== Location ==
Flinders Reef is one of a number of oceanic reefs rising from the Queensland plateau (17.6667°S 148.3333°E). It lies near the southwest edge, with the Queensland trough to the west separating it from the Great Barrier Reef, and the Townsville trough to the south separating it from the Marion plateau. It is 120 kilometres (75 mi) from the Great Barrier Reef, and 250 kilometres (155 mi) northeast of the Australian coastline. The position of the reef is around 17°37'S, 148°31'E, with weather station Cay located at 17°44'S, 148°26'E.

This area falls within the Coral Sea, which has a tropical climate and high rainfall. Water currents around the reef tend to originate from the southeast, propelled by trade winds. These currents form part of the wider South Equatorial Current. This drives changes in pH in the reef water, while annual pH changes are affected by La Niña events. The prevailing wind is mostly westward, coming from 270°. The region sometimes sees cyclones.

== Structure ==
The reef is quite large compared to its neighbours, stretching 40 kilometres (25 mi) north to south. A continuous 15 kilometres (9 mi) reef barrier stretches down the Eastern edge. Rising up from water over 1 kilometre (1 mi) deep, most of the reef lies at a depth of just 1–4 metres (3–13 ft). Sand covers 25 per cent of the reef flats.

The main body is known as North Flinders Reefs (17.550°S 148.433°E), with South Flinders Reefs being a smaller reef lying directly south of the main area (17.8075°S 148.5175°E). Dart Reef and Heralds Surprise are small reefs lying to the northwest and northeast respectively of the main reef.

== Biodiversity ==
The remote location means Flinders Reef and nearby reefs are poorly studied. The wildlife is distinct from that of the Great Barrier Reef, with these reefs likely acting as conduits for species dispersal between the Great Barrier Reef and the wider western Pacific Ocean. The reef is part of the Coral Sea Marine Park, and is designated as an IUCN protected habitat or species management area. One threat to the reef is climate change, which has caused coral bleaching. The area is a recreational diving site.

The reef flat areas of Flinders Reef have large populations of sponges, mostly consisting of four similar Dictyoceratida species: one from the Thorectidae family, and one each of the genera Carteriospongia, Phyllospongia, and Carteriospongia. A fifth species, part of the Dictyonella genus, is much rarer. Concentrations of sponges can reach 1.2 kilograms (2.6 lb) per 1 square metre (11 sq ft), and they cover around 7.3 per cent of the reef flat. At least one of these species may be phototropic, and through partnership with symbiotic cyanobacteria these sponges may extract over 50 per cent of their nutrition from sunlight.

== Anthropocene marker ==
Due to its isolation from local human influence, Flinders Reef is a candidate for the location of a Global Boundary Stratotype Section and Point to mark the beginning of the Anthropocene. The transition to the Anthropocene can be seen in samples of Porites coral, which can live for hundreds of years and continue growing throughout this period. Cores taken from this coral have annual growth bands between 0.8 centimetres (0.31 in) and 1.6 centimetres (0.63 in) long. These annual bands preserve information about the water chemistry of the reef at the time they formed.

Two cores have currently been taken. One, collected in May 1992 at 5–10 metres (16–33 ft) depth, is 3 metres (10 ft) long and extends from 1708 to 1992. The second one was taken in December 2017 at a depth of 5 metres (16 ft), and its 0.5 metres (2 ft) covers the period from 1835 to 2017. Both cores show a rise of carbon-14 in the 1950s, related to the use of nuclear weapons, which declines after 1975. They also preserve changes in carbon isotopes which are caused by the burning of fossil fuels. Through changes in oxygen, strontium, and calcium isotopes, information can be gained about surrounding ocean temperature, which began increasing in the 1850s, with this increase accelerating beginning in the 1970s. Boron isotopes indicate ocean acidity peaking in 2000. The environmental indicators in the cores from Flinders Reef correlate with cores taken from multiple locations within the Great Barrier Reef.
