= Coral Sea Marine Park =

Protected marine park in Australia

- IUCN category IV (habitat/species management area)
- Map showing the Coral Sea Marine Park. Shaded areas are Sanctuary or National Park zones ('no take' zones).
- Location: Australia
- Coordinates: 17.226°S 151.380°E
- Area: 989,836 km^{2} (382,178 sq mi)
- Established: 1 July 2018
- Operator: Parks Australia
- Website: https://parksaustralia.gov.au/marine/parks/coral-sea/

The Coral Sea Marine Park (previously known as the Coral Sea Commonwealth Marine Reserve) is an Australian marine park located in the Coral Sea off the coast of Queensland. The marine park covers an area of 989,836 km^{2} (382,178 sq mi) and is assigned IUCN category IV. It is Australia's largest single marine park and together with the French Natural Park of the Coral Sea (French: Parc naturel de la mer de Corail) form the largest protected area in the World.

The Coral Sea Marine Park lies directly adjacent to and east of the Great Barrier Reef Marine Park.

== Conservation values ==
=== Species and habitat ===
- Humpback whales during their annual migration along the east coast of Australia;
- Nesting and inter-nesting sites for green turtles;
- Breeding and foraging areas for multiple seabird species including noddies, terns, boobies, frigatebirds, and tropic birds;
- White shark distribution and whale shark aggregation.
- Transient populations of highly migratory pelagic species, including small fish schools, billfish, tuna and sharks.
- The East Australian Current forms in the region and is considered a major pathway for mobile predators such as billfish and tunas. Black marlin undergo seasonal movements into the Queensland Plateau area.

=== Bioregions and other features ===
- Includes three Key Ecological Features: the reefs, cays and herbivorous fish of the Queensland Plateau and the Marion Plateau and the northern extent of the Tasmantid Seamount Chain.
- Heritage values include several historic shipwrecks including three World War II shipwrecks from the Battle of the Coral Sea.
- The reserve represents the full range of seafloor features found in the region, including numerous reefs ranging from Ashmore and Boot Reefs in the north of the region to Cato Island and surrounding reefs in the south. The reserve includes canyons, troughs and plateaux, including Bligh Canyon approximately 200 kilometres off the coast from Lockhart River and the Townsville Trough, which separates the Queensland and Marion Plateaux. The reserve extends into the deeper waters of the Coral Sea Basin in the north, and provides protection for the pinnacles of the northern extent of the Tasmantid seamount chain.
- Six provincial bioregions, 94 depth ranges, and 16 seafloor types are represented in the reserve.

== History ==
The Coral Sea Commonwealth Marine Reserve was proclaimed in December 2013, and renamed as a 'Marine Park' in October 2017.

The original management plan for the Coral Sea Marine Park was suspended before it came into effect on 1 July 2014. The plans, which cover the zoning and protection measures of the marine park, were later subject to review as part of a wider review into the Commonwealth Marine Reserves announced in 2012.

On 1 July 2018 the management plan and protection measures came into effect for the first time. Under the new management plan, 'no take' zones in the marine park were reduced in area by approximately 53% compared to the original proposed zoning.

=== Former reserves ===
The Coral Sea Marine Park encompasses the former Coral Sea Conservation Zone, former Coringa-Herald National Nature Reserve and former Lihou Reef National Nature Reserve.

=== Coral Sea Frontier expedition ===
The Coral Sea Frontier expedition (voyage IN2025_V06) was a 35-day deep-sea research voyage conducted aboard the CSIRO research vessel RV Investigator in the marine park. The voyage, led by chief scientist and shark taxonomist Will White, surveyed benthic marine life at depths of 200 to 3,000 metres and led to the identification of more than 110 fish and invertebrate species new to science, announced in April 2026. Much of its deep-water environment had never been systematically surveyed before the voyage.

The expedition was a collaboration between CSIRO, Australia's national science agency, and The Nippon Foundation-Nekton Ocean Census programme, with participants from institutions including the Australian Museum and James Cook University.

RV Investigator departed Brisbane in October 2025 and travelled as far as Mellish Reef, approximately 1,000 kilometres off the Queensland coast. Researchers focused on two key ecological features of the marine park: the reefs of the Marion Plateau and the Tasmantid Seamount Chain. The voyage included the first modern deep-water investigation of marine life on the extinct volcanic peaks of the northern Tasmantid Seamount Chain, which rise more than 3,000 metres from the seafloor, and the offshore Kenn Plateau. The science team used a newly developed deep-towed underwater camera platform to observe seafloor habitats, capturing footage of a rarely seen deepwater sand tiger shark, a relative of the grey nurse shark. The voyage also completed the first complete bathymetric mapping of the Mellish Seamount, an underwater mountain taller than Mount Kosciuszko, and discovered a previously unknown complex canyon system on the Marion Plateau.

In April 2026, CSIRO and Ocean Census announced that taxonomists working through the collected specimens had identified more than 110 fish and invertebrate species new to science, a figure expected to exceed 200 as further cryptic species are distinguished. The identifications were made during a series of taxonomy workshops held around Australia, combining morphological analysis with DNA sequencing. Chief scientist Will White identified four new chondrichthyan species during the workshops: two rays in the genera Dipturus and Urolophus, a deepwater catshark in the genus Apristurus, and a chimaera in the genus Chimaera. New invertebrates, including jellyfish, sponges and polychaete worms, were recorded from deep waters adjacent to the Great Barrier Reef and from remote seamounts. Specimens from the voyage were deposited in collections across Australia, including state museums and the CSIRO Australian National Fish Collection, to support future taxonomic description, a process that can take many years per species.

The findings substantially improved bathymetric and habitat data for the Coral Sea Marine Park and were described by researchers as crucial for protecting Australian marine biodiversity. Ocean Census head of science Michelle Taylor said the workshops helped close global gaps in knowledge about undocumented marine life.

== Summary of protection zones ==
The Coral Sea Marine Park has been assigned IUCN protected area category IV. However, within the marine park there are multiple protection zones, each zone has an IUCN category and related rules for managing activities to ensure the protection of marine habitats and species.

The following table is a summary of the zoning rules within the Coral Sea Marine Park:

Zone	IUCN	Activities permitted						Total area (km^{2})
Zone	IUCN	Vessel transiting	Recreational fishing	Commercial fishing	Commercial aquaculture	Commercial tourism	Mining	Total area (km^{2})
National Park	II	Yes	No	No	No	excludes fishing, with approval	No	238,400
Habitat Protection	IV	Yes	Yes	some, with approval	with approval	with approval	No	655,129
Habitat Protection (Reefs)	IV	Yes	Yes	hand and dropline, with approval	with approval	with approval	No	29,827
Special Purpose (Trawl)	VI	Yes	Yes	most, with approval	with approval	with approval	No	66,480
External link: Zoning and rules for the Coral Sea Marine Park

== See also ==
- Protected areas managed by the Australian government
- Great Barrier Reef Marine Park
