= Single-gender world =

Relatively common motif in speculative fiction

A relatively common motif in speculative fiction is the existence of single-gender worlds or single-sex societies. These fictional societies have long been one of the primary ways to explore implications of gender and gender-differences in science fiction and fantasy.

In the fictional setting, these societies often arise due to elimination of one sex through war or natural disasters and disease. The societies may be portrayed as utopian or dystopian, as seen in pulp tales of oppressive matriarchies.

== Women-only worlds ==
There is a long tradition of female-only places in literature and mythology, starting with the Amazons and continuing into some examples of feminist utopias. In speculative fiction, women-only worlds have been imagined to come about, among other approaches, by the action of disease that wipes out men, along with the development of technological or mystical method that allow women to reproduce parthenogenically. The societies may not necessarily be lesbian, or sexual at all—a famous early sexless example being Herland (1915) by Charlotte Perkins Gilman.

=== In literature ===
During the pulp era, matriarchal dystopias were relatively common, in which women-only or women-controlled societies were shown unfavourably. In John Wyndham's Consider Her Ways (1956), male rule is shown as being repressive of women, but freedom from patriarchy is only possible in an authoritarian caste-based female-only society. Poul Anderson's "Virgin Planet" depicted a world where five hundred castaway women found a way of reproducing asexually—but the daughter is genetically identical to the mother—with the result that eventually the planet has a large population composed entirely of "copies" of the original women. In this woman-only world, human males are considered mythical creatures—and a man who lands on the planet after centuries of isolation finds it difficult to prove that he really is one.

Themyscira, the home island of DC Comics' Amazon superheroine Wonder Woman, was created by William Moulton Marston to allegorize the safety and security of the home where women thrived apart from the hostile, male-dominated work place. It is governed by "Aphrodite's Law", which states: "Penalty of death to any man attempting to set foot on Themyscira."

British sci-fi writer Edmund Cooper explored the subject in several of his novels, including Five to Twelve (1968) and Who Needs Men (1972).

Alice Bradley Sheldon, under the pen name James Tiptree Jr., explored the sexual impulse and gender as two of her main themes; in her award-winning "Houston, Houston, Do You Read?" (collected in Her Smoke Rose Up Forever), she presents a female-only society after the extinction of men from disease. The society lacks stereotypically "male" problems such as war and crime, but only recently resumed space exploration. The women reproduce via cloning and consider men to be comical.

Such worlds have been portrayed often by lesbian or feminist authors; their use of female-only worlds allows the exploration of female independence and freedom from patriarchy.

Women-only society are often shown to be utopian by feminist writers. Several influential feminist utopias of this sort were written in the 1970s; the most often studied examples include Joanna Russ's The Female Man, Suzy McKee Charnas's Walk to the End of the World and Motherlines. Female-only societies may be seen as an extreme type of a biased sex-ratio, another common theme in science fiction. However, some male authors have portrayed female-dominated worlds as dystopian, as discussed in Joanna Russ's essay "Amor Vincit Foeminam: The Battle of the Sexes in Science Fiction".

Some lesbian separatist authors have used female-only societies to additionally posit that all women would be lesbians if having no possibility of sexual interaction with men, as in Ammonite (1993) by Nicola Griffith. The enormously influential The Female Man (1975) and "When It Changed" (1972) by Joanna Russ portrayed a peaceful agrarian society of lesbians who resent the later intrusion of men, and a world in which women plan a genocidal war against men, implying that the utopian lesbian society is the result of this war.

A Door into Ocean is a 1986 feminist science fiction novel by Joan Slonczewski. The novel shows themes of ecofeminism and nonviolent revolution, combined with Slonczewski's own knowledge in the field of biology. The water moon Shora is inhabited by women living on rafts who have a culture and language based on sharing and a mastery of molecular biology that allows them to reproduce by parthenogenesis.

In Elizabeth Bear's Carnival (2006), a matriarchal, primarily lesbian society called New Amazonia has risen up on a lush planet amidst abandoned alien technology that includes a seemingly inexhaustible power supply. The Amazonian women are aggressive and warlike, but also pragmatic and defensive of their freedom from the male-dominated Earth-centric Coalition that seeks to conquer them. Distrustful of male aggression, they subjugate their men, a minority they tolerate solely for reproduction and labor.

Kameron Hurley's The Stars are Legion (2017) is set somewhere on the outer rim of the universe, into a mass of decaying world-ships known as the Legion is traveling in the seams between the stars. There are no males anywhere in the Legion. Women are given birth by, and live inside, biological entities called Worlds. Women living inside the Worlds become pregnant without sex and give birth to various biological beings and spare parts which are used to keep the Worlds, and thus their civilization, alive and functioning.

Jonathan Frame's Schrödinger’s Elephant (2018) is a collection of five novellas exploring overpopulation and the idea humanity is programmed to maintain its population levels sub-consciously through violence, war and so on. Each novella deals with a moment in human history as women violently revolt against men to eradicate human males, the remaining female population learning to live in the world they have engineered.

Alexander Scot McPhie's Female Planet (2018) is a novel in which disease has wiped out all the males on Earth. After a recession and extensive rebuilding period, women now run the Earth, but many of the same roles and power imbalances have been recreated. In this scenario a young couple become pregnant through artificial fertilisation but have to deal with the fallout when the sex of the child is revealed to be male.

=== In other media ===
The 1984 Polish film Sexmission deals with a dystopian women-only society where all men have died out. Women reproduce through parthenogenesis, living in a feminist society, where apparatchiks teach that women suffered under men until men were removed from the world.

Lithia, Episode 17 of the fourth season of the 1995 remake of The Outer Limits, features a man who was cryogenically frozen and awakens in a world populated only by women. Men died due to a war and a subsequent virus that affected males. They reproduce by artificial insemination using frozen sperm left over from the time when there were men.

Vandread, an anime series from 2000, begins on the premise that men and women separated sometime after the colonization of space and moved to separate planets, Taraak and Mejeer. Through circumstances a small group of men and woman are forced to cooperate to get home again from the depths of space and fight a common enemy.

The 2010 German vampire film We Are the Night explores the idea of feminist separatism. In the film, the female vampire committed genocide against male vampire somewhere at the end of the 1800s after many of them already had been killed by humans, as they were "too careless" and risked exposure to humanity. The female vampires agreed amongst each other never to turn another man into a vampire.

In the Mass Effect universe, the asari are a monogender-pansexual species, outwardly appearing as 'female' and using female pronouns and descriptors for the benefit of dual-gendered species. With their reproductive system based on the 'melding' of nervous systems rather than the exchange of genetic material, asari are capable of procreating with any sex, gender or species but with the resultant offspring being always asari.

== Men-only worlds ==
Men-only societies are much less common. Joanna Russ suggests this is because men do not feel oppressed, and therefore imagining a world free of women does not imply an increase in freedom and is not as attractive.

=== In literature ===
The earliest mention of an all-male society seems to be the myth of the creation of man in Greek mythology by the titan Prometheus, as recorded in Hesiod's 8th century BCE Theogony. To punish Prometheus for his trick at Mecone, Zeus hid the fire from men, but Prometheus managed to steal it back and restore it to mankind. This infuriated Zeus even more, who sent the first woman, Pandora, to live with mankind. Hesiod writes, "From her is the race of women and female kind: of her is the deadly race and tribe of women who live amongst mortal men to their great trouble, no helpmeets in hateful poverty, but only in wealth."

Some mythological creatures are often considered solely male, such as the satyrs, pans, centaurs, gigantes and cyclopes of Greek mythology and the dragons of Chinese mythology. Female centaurs, called centaurides or centauresses, are not mentioned in early Greek literature and art; they appear only occasionally in later antiquity. In Antiquity and the Middle Ages, werewolves were always described as male (in Old English the word wer means "man"; it is cognate to virile). Descriptions of female werewolves began to be seen from the end of the 16th century.

The myth of the origin of the Myrmidons told in Ovid's Metamorphoses says that Zeus transformed the ants on the island of Aegina into a race of men, repopulating at the request of his son Aeacus the island devastated by a plague sent by Hera. In Homer's Iliad, the Myrmidons are the soldiers commanded by Aeacus' grandson Achilles, who brought them to Troy to fight in the Trojan War.

According to ancient Greek records there were the Gargareans, an all-male tribe on the northern foothills of the Caucasus Mountains that copulated annually with the Amazons in order to keep both tribes reproductive. The Amazons kept the female children, and gave the males to the Gargareans. The Ancient Greek chronicler Strabo mentioned that both the Gargareans and Amazons had migrated from Themiscyra.

In the 2nd century CE, Lucian of Samosata tells in his fictional work A True Story that the inhabitants of the Moon, the Selenitans, are all males, completely unaware of the female gender. As adults they marry man to man and have children, always male, begotten in their legs, in the manner of Zeus begetting Dionysus in his thigh. There are a kind of men among them called Dendritans, who generate children by cutting and planting the right testicle in the earth, from which a flesh tree grows bearing a fruit the size of a cubit, from which the baby son is harvested.

Although in Catholic tradition angels are considered spiritual beings without sex or gender, in the Bible they always have male names and are referred to by male pronouns. The so-called "Sons of God" are interpreted as angels who fathered children with human women, thus indicating that they are sexually masculine beings.

In The Smurfs franchise (1958–present), all of the original Smurfs were male; later female additions are Smurfette and Sassette. Smurfette was Gargamel's creation, while Sassette was created by the Smurflings.

Cordwainer Smith's 1964 short story The Crime and the Glory of Commander Suzdal portrays the Arachosians as a society in which almost all women died, and they were only able to save some of their women by chemically (and later genetically) making them male.

The Bene Tleilax, more commonly called the Tleilaxu, in the Dune series (1965–present) were a group of genetically altered humans who inhabited Tleilax, the sole planet of the star Thalim. They were a male society, and kept semi-conscious female Tleilaxu in machines for the sole purpose of their genetic experiments.

A. Bertram Chandler's A Spartan Planet (1969), also known as False Fatherland, features the men-only planet Sparta, in which human beings are produced by birth machines — women are unknown, and the society is dedicated to the values of militarism loosely modeled upon the ancient Greek city state of Sparta. Male homosexuality is the norm, and the protagonist, policeman Brasidus, has a partner named Achron, a male cr̀eche nurse.

In 1982 children's novel The BFG (short for "The Big Friendly Giant"), the giants are exclusively male and simply come into being.

The main character in Frank Herbert's The White Plague (1982) loses his family to terrorist action in Ireland. He responds by developing a biological weapon that kills only women. He warns the world to isolate Ireland to avoid spread of the disease. World leaders do not take the threat seriously and the disease is spread around the world.

In the Dragon Ball franchise (1984–present), Namekians and Frieza's race are all-male, and they reproduce asexually: Namekians lay eggs from their mouths, and Frieza was said to have been born to his father only.

In Moto Hagio's 1985 yaoi manga Marginal, on a future Earth a biochemical apocalypse has made women extinct, and, for centuries, the all-male population of Earth has survived by depending on only one woman, whose ova are harvested to create genetically engineered children (only boys). By the year 2999, society has restructured itself into clans and villages of all-male families and partnerships.

Ethan of Athos (1986) by Lois Bujold, inspired by the real world men-only religious society of Mount Athos, shows a world in which men have isolated their planet from the rest of civilization to avoid the "corrupting" effect of women. Children are grown in uterine replicators, using ova derived from tissue cultures; the novel's plot is driven by the declining fertility of these cultures. The titular "unlikely hero" is gay obstetrician Dr. Ethan Urquhart, whose dangerous adventure alongside the first woman he has ever met presents both a future society where homosexuality is the norm and the lingering sexism and homophobia of our own world.

The manga and anime series Saber Marionette (1995) features a planet in the 22nd century colonized by humans from Earth whose only survivors of the travel were men. Called Terra 2, for three centuries the new world was inhabited solely by men who reproduced through cloning technology until they were able to create female androids name marionettes, creations that, while they serve their purpose, operate without sapience, emotion, or free will.

The Achuultani from 2003 Empire from the Ashes trilogy, a mysterious alien race that periodically exterminates all intelligent life it can find, are all men that have been reproducing by cloning for millions of years.

The novel This Gay Utopia (2005) by John Butler imagines male-only spaces in a small town in which both straight and gay men engage in homosexual relations.

The gay fantasy book series Regelance (2012) by J. L. Langley depicts a world where men are able to reproduce via replicative technology. While there are still women amongst the lower classes, who reproduce in the traditional manner, there are none among the upper classes which the series focuses on.

The goblins in Goblin Slayer (2016–present) are an entirely male species and they reproduce by kidnapping and raping females.

In Fudanshi Shōkan (2019–present), university student Kotone Aizuhara is a fudanshi, an avid male fan of boys' love manga. During a visit to a bookstore, a truck crashes into a book stand and Kotone apparently dies buried under a pile of BL books. When he wakes up, he finds himself in an alternate world with no women, where the sacred snake beast, Nagi, takes him as his bridegroom.

In 2020 manga World's End Harem: Britannia Lumière, high school girl Eri is suddenly summoned to another world, "Britannia", where only men exist.

=== In other media ===
Despite being robotic life forms with non-sexual reproduction methods, Autobots and Decepticons from the Transformers franchise (1984–present) were understood to be by default all male. Female Transformers were originally considered anomalies.

The parodic film Gayniggers from Outer Space (1992) follows a group of intergalactic homosexual black men as they exterminate the female population of the Earth, eventually creating a utopic male-only world.

In 1995 Xenaverse TV series Hercules: The Legendary Journeys and Xena: Warrior Princess the centaurs are all male and reproduce with human women.

Some Pokémon species in Pokémon francise (1996–present) are entirely male, such as Hitmonlee, Hitmonchan and Latios.

The 1997 science fiction comedy show Lexx, in the episode "Nook" (February 19, 1999), featured a planet populated entirely by monks of a strange repressive order who were forced to spend their lives copying books they could not read. They were not aware that women or other forms of society existed.

Vandread, an anime series from 2000, begins with the premise that men and women separated some time after the colonization of space and moved to different planets, Taraak and Mejeer, respectively, and have been at war with each other for decades. Due to circumstances, a small group of men and women are forced to cooperate to return home from the depths of space and fight a common enemy.

All vampires in 2007 New Zealand film Perfect Creature are males.

The Minions are an all-male species of small, yellow creatures that appear in Illumination's Despicable Me franchise (2010–present).

LISA: The Painful is a 2014 post-apocalyptic role-playing video game that takes place in a wasteland called Olathe. Once a normal town, following an unseen cataclysm known as "The Flash", all women have perished, and humanity was left with no way to reproduce.

The 2017 science fiction show The Orville featured a character Bortus played by Peter Macon who is a member of an exclusively masculine society, the Moclans, where female births are very rare. In the show's second episode, Bortus' female child Topa was surgically turned male against his wishes. In the third season she would realize what happened and reverse the procedure, turning back into a girl.

== Ungendered worlds ==
Still other worlds are presented without a local concept of gender or after gender has been made obsolete. Marge Piercy's Woman on the Edge of Time features a post-apocalyptic world populated by gender-neutral people. In Ann Leckie's Imperial Radch, the most prominent space empire of humanity no longer divides its population by gender, but some nations in other star systems still do.

== Sexless or hermaphroditic worlds ==
Some other fictional worlds feature societies in which everyone has more than one sex, or none, or can change sex. For example:

Ursula K. Le Guin's The Left Hand of Darkness (1969) depicts a world in which individuals are neither "male" nor "female" but at different times have either female or male sexual organs and reproductive abilities. Similar patterns exist in Greg Egan's novel Schild's Ladder and his novella Oceanic or in Storm Constantine's book series Wraeththu about an oogamous magical race that arose from mutant human beings.

John Varley, who also came to prominence in the 1970s, also often writes on gender-related themes. In his "Eight Worlds" suite of stories (many collected in The John Varley Reader) and novels, for example, humanity has achieved the ability to change sex at a whim. Homophobia is shown to initially inhibit uptake of this technology, as it engenders drastic changes in relationships, with homosexual sex becoming an acceptable option for all.

In Barry B. Longyear's 1979 novella Enemy Mine and its 1985 film adaptation, the Dracs are an intelligent hermaphroditic reptilian race from the planet Dracon that reproduces asexually.

In the Culture series of novels and stories by Iain M. Banks, humans can and do relatively easily (and reversibly) change sex.

== Sex segregation ==
Segregation of the sexes is another relatively common trope of speculative fiction—physical separation can result in societies that are essentially single-sex, although the majority of such works focus on the reunification of the sexes, or otherwise on links that remain between them, as with Sheri S. Tepper's The Gate to Women's Country, David Brin's Glory Season and Carol Emshwiller's Boys. An episode of Duckman also tried this.

In the Neanderthal Parallax novels by Robert J. Sawyer, a Neanderthal visitor from a parallel world where Homo sapiens became extinct and Neanderthals became the dominant species arrives on our world. The Neanderthal society is sexually segregated, with men and women interacting for only a few days each month, and reproduction being consciously limited to ten-year intervals.

Sometimes the segregation is social, and men and women interact to a limited extent. For example, when overpopulation drives the world away from heterosexuality in Charles Beaumont's short story The Crooked Man (1955), first published in Playboy, homosexuals oppress the heterosexual minority and relationships between men and women are made unlawful.

== See also ==
- Gendercide
- Androcide
- Femicide
- Misogyny
- Misandry
- Monastic community of Mount Athos
- Arcadia (utopia)
- Feminist utopia
- Gender in speculative fiction
- Hypergamy
- LGBT themes in speculative fiction
- Sex and sexuality in speculative fiction
