= Lihou Reef National Nature Reserve =

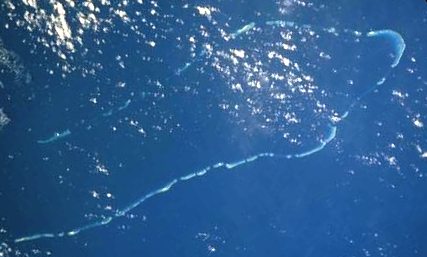
NASA picture of the Lihou Reef

Lihou Reef National Nature Reserve was a marine protected area covering an area of 8440 km^{2} in the Australian Coral Sea Islands Territory that was incorporated into the new Coral Sea Commonwealth Marine Reserve in December 2012. Together with the Coringa-Herald National Nature Reserve, from which it is separated by about 100 km of open ocean, it forms the Coral Sea Reserves Ramsar Site, designated on 16 August 2002, listing it under the Ramsar Convention as a wetland of international importance.

== History ==
Lihou Reef and its cays were discovered by Lieutenant John Lihou, R.N., on 23 February 1823. Lihou, then Master of the brig-sloop HMS Zenobia, was on passage from Manila to South America. After a hazardous passage through the reef, the ship departed the Great Barrier Reef via an opening near Murray Islands. On 23 February, the Lihou Reefs were sighted.

== Description ==
Lihou Reef Lighthouse
- Location: Lihou Reefs, Coral Sea Islands, Australia
- Coordinates: 17°08′28″S 152°08′21″E

Tower
- Foundation: four concrete piles
- Construction: metal skeletal tower lower part, fiberglass tower upper part
- Height: 34 m (112 ft)
- Shape: two-stage tower: quadrangular skeletal tower with balcony lower part, quadrangular tower with balcony upper part
- Markings: white skeletal lower tower, red upper tower
- Power source: solar power
- Operator: Australian Maritime Safety Authority

Light
- Focal height: 33 m (108 ft)
- Range: 19 nmi (35 km; 22 mi)
- Characteristic: Fl W 10s

Lihou Reef is the second largest atoll by total size in the Coral Sea, after the Chesterfield Islands (not counting the completely submerged Lansdowne Bank in the easternmost reaches of the Coral Sea). It is U-shaped, with an opening in the south-west. The size of the lagoon is about 100 by 30 km, with an area of 2529 km^{2}, making the atoll one of the largest in the world. Nevertheless, the total land area of the islets and cays is little more than a square kilometre. The lagoon is up to 60 m deep. The reserve contains 18 islets and cays, 9 each on the Northern Rim and the Southern Rim, ranging in size from 5,000 to 168,000 m^{2}.

=== Northern Rim ===
Total land area 560,000 m^{2}; the islets on the Northern Rim are, from southwest to northeast (clockwise):

- Juliette Cay (78,000 m^{2})
- Kathy Cay (40,000 m^{2})
- Lorna Cay (168,000 m^{2})
- Little Margaret Cay (10,000 m^{2})
- Margaret Cay (30,000 m^{2})
- Turtle Islet (31,000 m^{2})
- Middle Cay (78,000 m^{2})
- Observatory Cay (88,000 m^{2})
- Licklick Cay (40,000 m^{2})

Only Lorna Cay and Turtle Islet are vegetated. Turtle Islet reaches a height of 6 m, and Observatory Cay 2 m.

=== Southern Rim ===
Total land area 470,000 m^{2}.

The islets on the Southern Rim are, from northeast to southwest (clockwise):

- Anne Cay, "No 1 Cay" (112,000 m^{2})
- Betty Cay, "No 2 Cay" (37,000 m^{2})
- Carol Cay, "No 3 Cay" (5,000 m^{2})
- Dianna Cay, "No 4 Cay" (16,000 m^{2})
- Fanny Cay, "No 5 Cay" (7,000 m^{2})
- Edna Cay, "No 6 Cay" (73,000 m^{2})
- Helen Cay, "No 7 Cay" (10,000 m^{2})
- Georgina Cay, "No 8 Cay" (105,000 m^{2})
- Nellie Cay, "No 9 Cay" (104,000 m^{2})

Only the largest three of the Southern Rim, Anne Cay, Georgina Cay and Nellie Cay, are vegetated. Just northeast of Anne Cay is the Herald Passage into the lagoon.
