= Coringa-Herald National Nature Reserve =

Former nature reserve in Australia's Coral Sea Islands Territory

Coordinates: 17°04′S 150°39′E

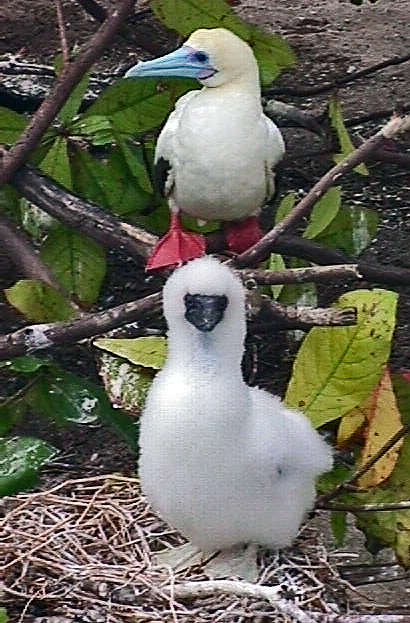
The IBA supports over 3000 breeding pairs of red-footed boobies

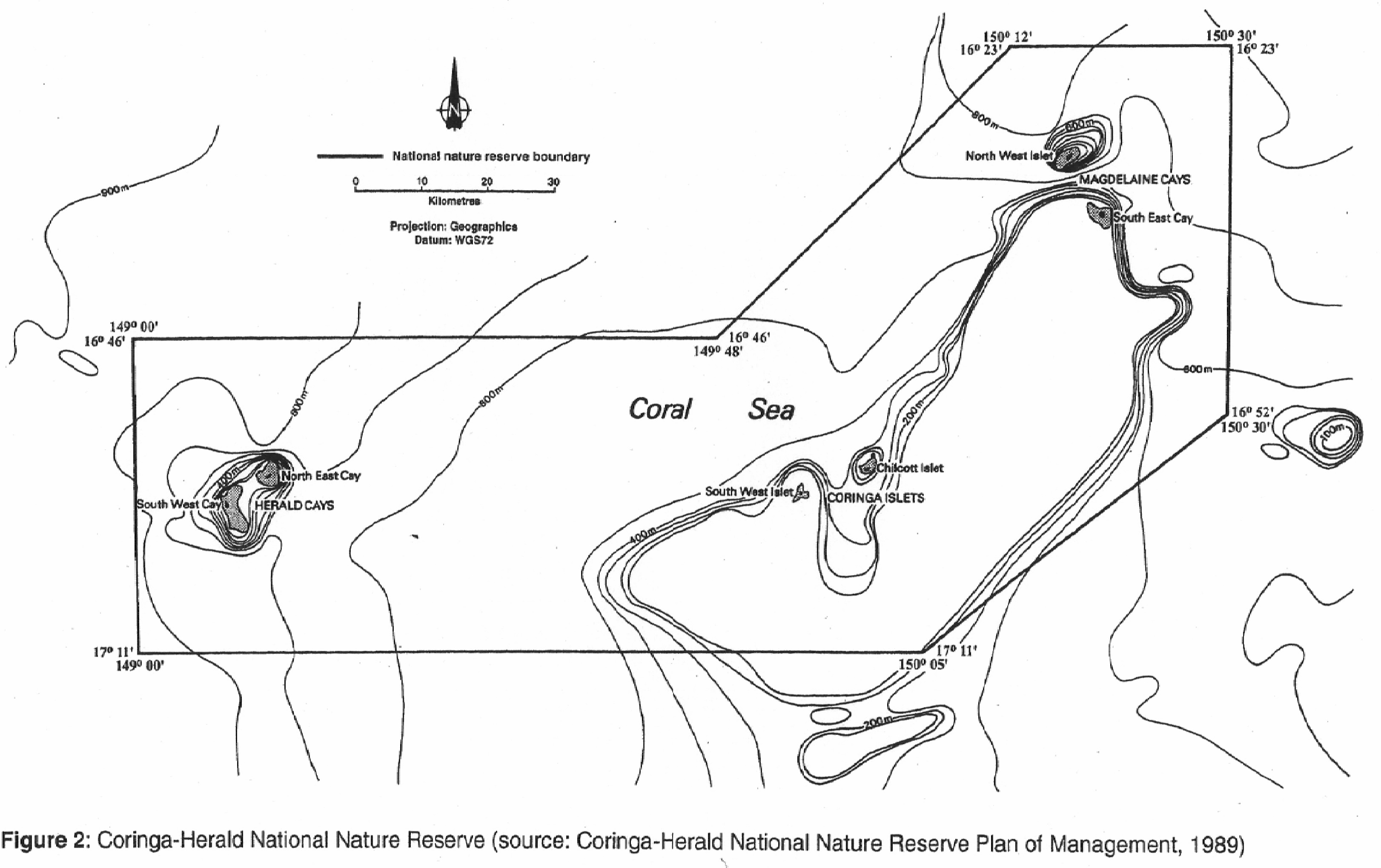
Sketch map of Coringa-Herald National Nature Reserve

Coringa-Herald National Nature Reserve is a former nature reserve in Australia’s Coral Sea Islands Territory that was incorporated into the new Coral Sea Commonwealth Marine Reserve in December 2012. The former nature reserve together with the Lihou Reef National Nature Reserve is part of the Coral Sea Reserves Ramsar Site. Its extent is also within the Coringa-Herald Reefs Important Bird Area.

== Description ==
The reserve lies to the east of the Great Barrier Reef and covers an area of 8,860 km^{2}, most of which is open water. It contains three pairs of islets and cays, the Herald Cays, comprising North East and South West Cays; the Coringa Islets, comprising Chilcott and South West Islets; and the Magdelaine Cays, comprising South East Cay and North West Islet. The pairs rise steeply from separate platform reef systems, each representing a distinct stage in reef formation, varying in size from 16 to 37 ha, and making a total land area of 124 ha. Each cay has a fringing reef that is fully exposed to the influences of ocean currents and swells.

The islets are formed of coral sand, rocks and coral rubble and rise no more than about five meters above sea-level. South-East Magdelaine Cay is the largest; parts of it, as well as North-East Herald Cay, have thick forests of Pisonia grandis and Cordia subcordata trees. Apart from North-West Magdelaine Islet which lacks vegetation, grasses and Heliotropium foertherianum shrubs grow on the other islets.

The 124 ha land area of the cays has been recognised by BirdLife International as the Coringa-Herald Reefs IBA because of its importance as a breeding site for seabirds. It supports over 1% of the world populations of wedge-tailed shearwaters, red-footed boobies, lesser frigatebirds, red-tailed tropicbirds and black noddies.
