= Murray Islands =

Islands in the South Orkney Islands

Coordinates: 60°47′S 44°31′W

Murray Islands is a group of small islands 1.2 nautical miles (2.2 km; 1.4 mi) southeast of Cape Whitson, off the south coast of Laurie Island in the South Orkney Islands. Discovered in 1823 by Matthew Brisbane, who explored the south coast of Laurie Island under the direction of James Weddell. The name "Murrys Islands" appears on Weddell's chart, but the islands are probably named for James Murray of London, maker of the chronometers used on Weddell's voyage.

== See also ==
- List of Antarctic and subantarctic islands
