= Coral Sea Islands =

External territory of Australia

Coral Sea Islands Territory
- Flag of Australia, used for the Coral Sea Islands

Geography
- Location: Coral Sea
- Coordinates: 17°26′24″S 151°4′30″E
- Major islands: Cato Island, Willis Island

Administration
- Australia

Demographics
- Population: 4

The Coral Sea Islands Territory is an external territory of Australia covering an area of 780,000 km^{2} (301,160 sq mi) in the Coral Sea, north-east of Queensland. The territory includes a number of small islands and reefs, with a total land area of about 7 km^{2} (3 sq mi). Apart from a small staff of Bureau of Meteorology employees at a weather station on Willis Island, the territory is uninhabited.

The islands and reefs of the Coral Sea were charted in the early 1800s, and some were briefly mined for guano between the 1870s and 1880s. A weather monitoring station was established on Willis Island in 1921. In 1969 the Australian parliament passed legislation proclaiming the Coral Sea Islands Territory as an external territory, and in 1997 the legislation was amended to include Elizabeth Reef and Middleton Reef within the territory.

Today, the territory is covered by the Lord Howe Island Marine Park and Coral Sea Marine Park. The islands are an important breeding site for turtles and seabirds, and the Coral Sea serves as a migratory corridor for humpback whales and for some species of fish and eels. It is often visited by tourist vessels for snorkelling, diving, and fishing.

== History ==
The islands and reefs in the Coral Sea Islands Territory were first charted during the early 1800s. Middleton Reef was sighted in 1788 and was named after the admiral Charles Middleton, while Elizabeth Reef was likely discovered in 1820. Between the 1870s and 1880s, many of the islands were mined for guano, but no permanent settlements were established. A large number of shipwrecks occurred in the region during the 1800s.

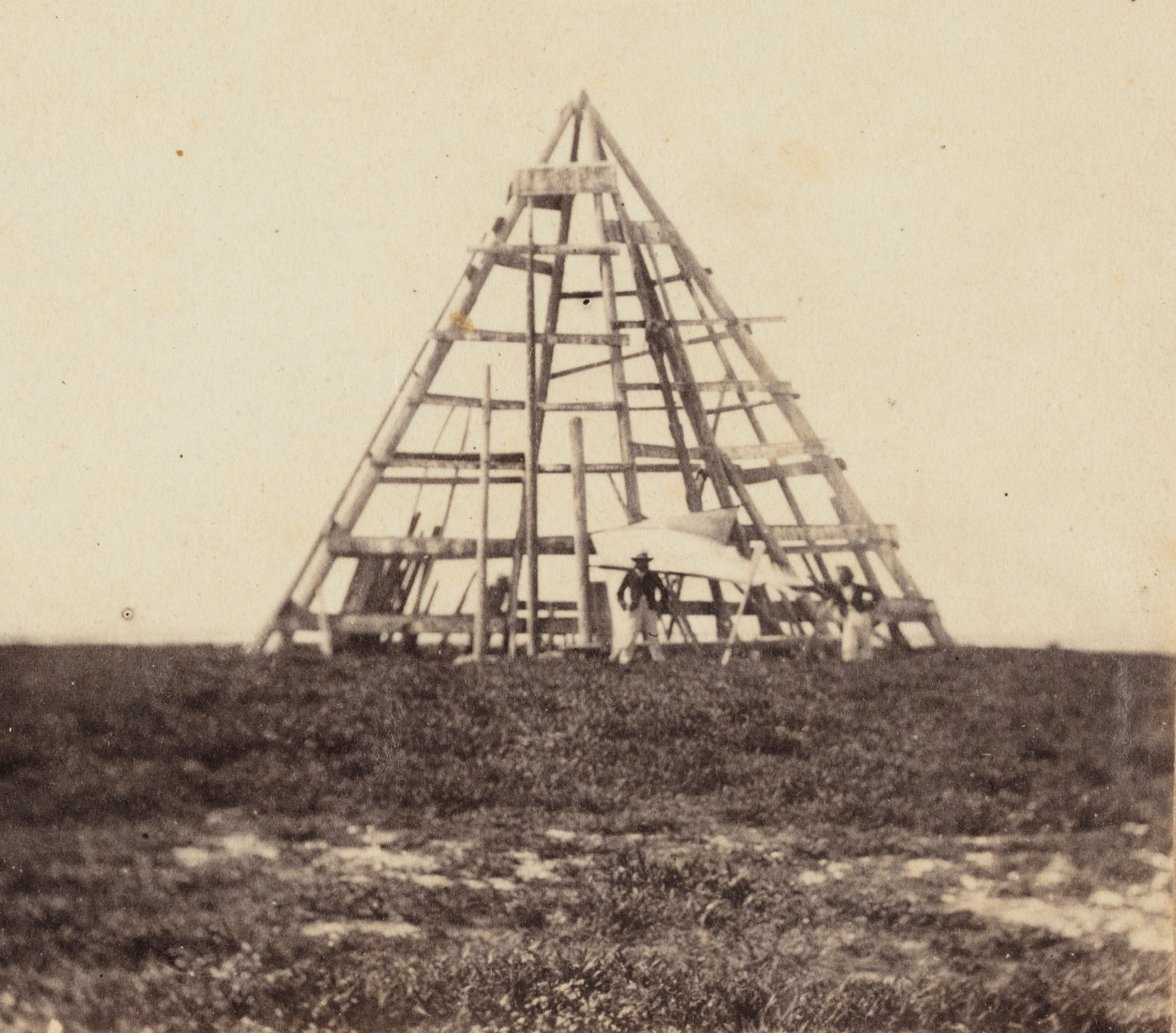
Beacon erected on Mellish Reef in the central Coral Sea in 1859

Jurisdiction over offshore islands in the Coral Sea was historically unclear. In 1900, letters patent issued by the British government included within the boundary of the colony of New South Wales all islands in the Coral Sea west of the 154th meridian east that were not otherwise part of the Colony of Queensland or British New Guinea. Minutes prepared by the Department of Defence and Department of External Affairs suggested that the Coral Sea Islands had been made British possessions by virtue of James Cook proclaiming British sovereignty over Australia in 1770, but "that there were certain islets and reefs in the Coral Sea that were British possessions but not part of the Commonwealth, and some were shown not to be in the possession of any nation." A weather monitoring outpost was first established on Willis Island in 1921.

During the 1930s, Australia became more concerned about the status of the islands due to increasing activity from the United States and Japan in the region. However, it was unclear whether the islands were under British sovereignty or were already part of the states of New South Wales or Queensland. Britain also questioned whether sovereignty over the islands could be asserted given that they were not able to support human occupation. These ambiguities, as well as the distraction caused by the Second World War, caused the Australian government to cease investigating the status of the islands for a time.

In the 1950s the Australian government began a review of its maritime boundaries in line with the evolving definitions of continental shelf later formalised in the Convention on the Continental Shelf. The federal cabinet resolved to assert federal jurisdiction over the Coral Sea islands in 1957, but action was delayed by continued uncertainty over whether the islands were already part of the states of New South Wales and Queensland, or attached to the British Solomon Islands, and therefore needed those jurisdictions' approval. In 1967, following discussions with state governments over the proposed sea and submerged lands legislation, the Attorney-General Nigel Bowen proposed that the federal government should unilaterally annex the islands, "on the basis that they have already become Commonwealth territory as a result of the Commonwealth’s own previous and sufficient exercise of authority in relation to them."

In August 1968, the Australian government requested and received confirmation from the United Kingdom that it did not claim "any right or interest" over specified islands in the Coral Sea between the 154th and 158th meridian east and that it recognised Australian sovereignty over those islands. This resolved any jurisdictional issues over the "outer" Coral Sea islands.

=== Federal territory ===
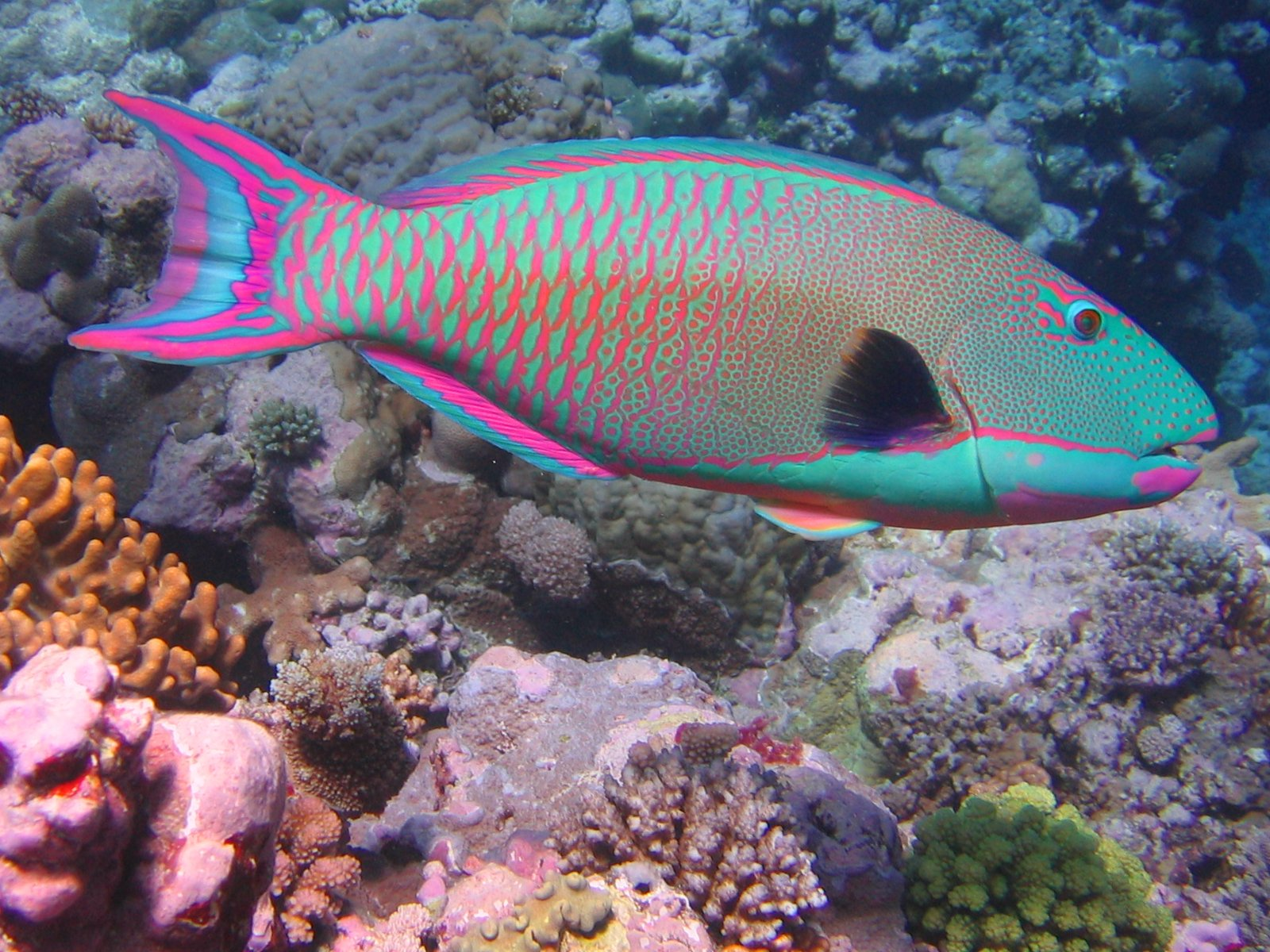
A male spotted parrotfish on North Horn, Osprey Reef

The Coral Sea Islands Act 1969 was passed by the Parliament of Australia and received royal assent on 2 September 1969, coming into force on 30 September 1969. The act established the specified islands as a separate Australian external territory under the name "Coral Sea Islands Territory" and allowed the federal government to enact ordinances in line with its other territories. In 1982 the Lihou Reef National Nature Reserve and Coringa-Herald National Nature Reserve were established in parts of the territory.

In 1997 the Coral Sea Islands Act 1969 was amended to include Elizabeth Reef and Middleton Reef within the territory. These reefs are nearly 800 kilometres (500 mi) to the south of the other islands, closer to Lord Howe Island which is part of the state of New South Wales. They had been excluded from the initial act as the Attorney-General's Department considered they could "not reasonably be regarded as being included in the International Law Commission's definition of the continental shelf", although some sources had previously considered them part of New South Wales. In 1986, the government had received advice from the Attorney-General's Department that the reefs should be considered "territory otherwise acquired by the Commonwealth" under section 122 of the constitution and in 1987 declared them to be a marine national nature reserve under the National Parks and Wildlife Conservation Act 1975.

A micronation named the Gay and Lesbian Kingdom of the Coral Sea Islands was declared in the territory in 2004 to protest the introduction of an amendment to the Marriage Act 1961 that would codify a heterosexual definition of marriage. A group of activists landed on Cato Island, where they raised the pride flag and laid a plaque. The micronation declared that it had dissolved in 2017 after Australia legalised same-sex marriage. In 2012 the Coral Sea Marine Park was established, covering an area that included the former Lihou Reef National Nature Reserve and Coringa-Herald National Nature Reserve. The Lord Howe Island Marine Park also replaced the former Lord Howe Island Marine Park (Commonwealth waters) and the Middleton and Elizabeth Reefs Marine National Nature Reserve.

== Geography ==
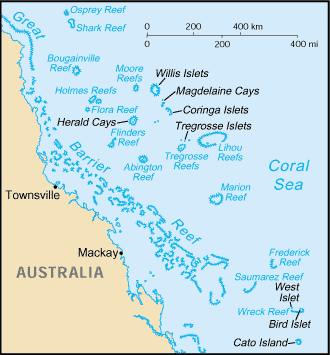
Map of the Coral Sea Islands, not including Elizabeth and Middleton Reefs

The Coral Sea Islands Territory covers an area of approximately 780,000 square kilometres off the coast of Queensland in the Coral Sea adjacent to the Great Barrier Reef. It is bounded by the edge of the Great Barrier Reef, the longitude 159 10 E and the latitudes 12S and 30 3S. It consists of a number of reefs and island groups; the islands have a total land area of around 7 km^{2} (3 sq mi). The islands are mostly composed of coral and sand, with limited vegetation. They are all low-lying; the highest point in the territory, located on Cato Island, sits just 9 metres above sea level.

The islands form two groups: one, in the north-west, includes (among others) Willis Island, Herald and Lihou Cays, and Holmes, Moore, Osprey, and Bougainville Reefs. The second, in the south-east, includes Cato Island and the Frederick, Kenn, and Saumarez Reefs. The territory also includes Elizabeth and Middleton Reefs, located further south in the Tasman Sea to the north of Lord Howe Island. The islands have a tropical climate are sometimes affected by tropical cyclones between November and April.

=== Climate ===
Climate data for Willis Island (1921–2025)
| Month | Jan | Feb | Mar | Apr | May | Jun | Jul | Aug | Sep | Oct | Nov | Dec | Year |
|---|---|---|---|---|---|---|---|---|---|---|---|---|---|
| Record high °C (°F) | 35.1 (95.2) | 35.2 (95.4) | 33.8 (92.8) | 33.9 (93.0) | 31.5 (88.7) | 32.2 (90.0) | 29.8 (85.6) | 30.0 (86.0) | 31.6 (88.9) | 32.6 (90.7) | 33.6 (92.5) | 34.8 (94.6) | 35.2 (95.4) |
| Mean daily maximum °C (°F) | 30.8 (87.4) | 30.5 (86.9) | 30.0 (86.0) | 29.0 (84.2) | 27.8 (82.0) | 26.6 (79.9) | 26.1 (79.0) | 26.4 (79.5) | 27.4 (81.3) | 28.7 (83.7) | 29.9 (85.8) | 30.7 (87.3) | 28.7 (83.7) |
| Mean daily minimum °C (°F) | 25.8 (78.4) | 25.8 (78.4) | 25.5 (77.9) | 24.9 (76.8) | 23.9 (75.0) | 22.8 (73.0) | 22.1 (71.8) | 22.1 (71.8) | 22.7 (72.9) | 23.7 (74.7) | 24.8 (76.6) | 25.5 (77.9) | 24.1 (75.4) |
| Record low °C (°F) | 20.7 (69.3) | 20.9 (69.6) | 20.9 (69.6) | 18.9 (66.0) | 19.9 (67.8) | 16.9 (62.4) | 17.2 (63.0) | 16.4 (61.5) | 18.6 (65.5) | 18.9 (66.0) | 20.9 (69.6) | 21.1 (70.0) | 16.4 (61.5) |
| Average rainfall mm (inches) | 197.1 (7.76) | 212.6 (8.37) | 204.1 (8.04) | 124.4 (4.90) | 71.6 (2.82) | 53.8 (2.12) | 38.2 (1.50) | 23.7 (0.93) | 16.9 (0.67) | 21.2 (0.83) | 37.4 (1.47) | 96.3 (3.79) | 1,099.2 (43.28) |
| Average rainy days (≥ 1mm) | 10.7 | 11.7 | 12.4 | 9.3 | 7.1 | 5.8 | 4.4 | 3.3 | 2.3 | 2.3 | 3.5 | 6.6 | 79.4 |
| Average afternoon relative humidity (%) | 74 | 78 | 77 | 75 | 74 | 71 | 69 | 68 | 68 | 69 | 68 | 71 | 72 |

== Governance and human activity ==
The territory is governed by the laws of the Australian Capital Territory and is under the criminal jurisdiction of the Supreme Court of Norfolk Island. Under the Coral Sea Islands Act 1969, the Governor-General of Australia is empowered to make ordinances for the governance of the territory. A parliamentary secretary appointed by the Minister for Regional Development, Local Government, and Territories is responsible for the administration of the territory. It is regularly patrolled by the Royal Australian Navy and the Australian Border Force.

The islands are largely uninhabited, apart from a small contingent of Bureau of Meteorology staff on Willis Island. Other islands and reefs in the territory are home to man-made structures, including weather stations and a lighthouse. Unmanned weather stations are located on Bougainville Reef, Cato Island, Flinders Reef, Frederick Reef, Holmes Reef, Lihou Reef, Creal Reef, Marion Reef and Gannet Cay. The territory is visited for fishing, snorkelling, and diving, mostly by visitors on live-aboard tour boats that pass through the Great Barrier Reef.

== Biodiversity ==
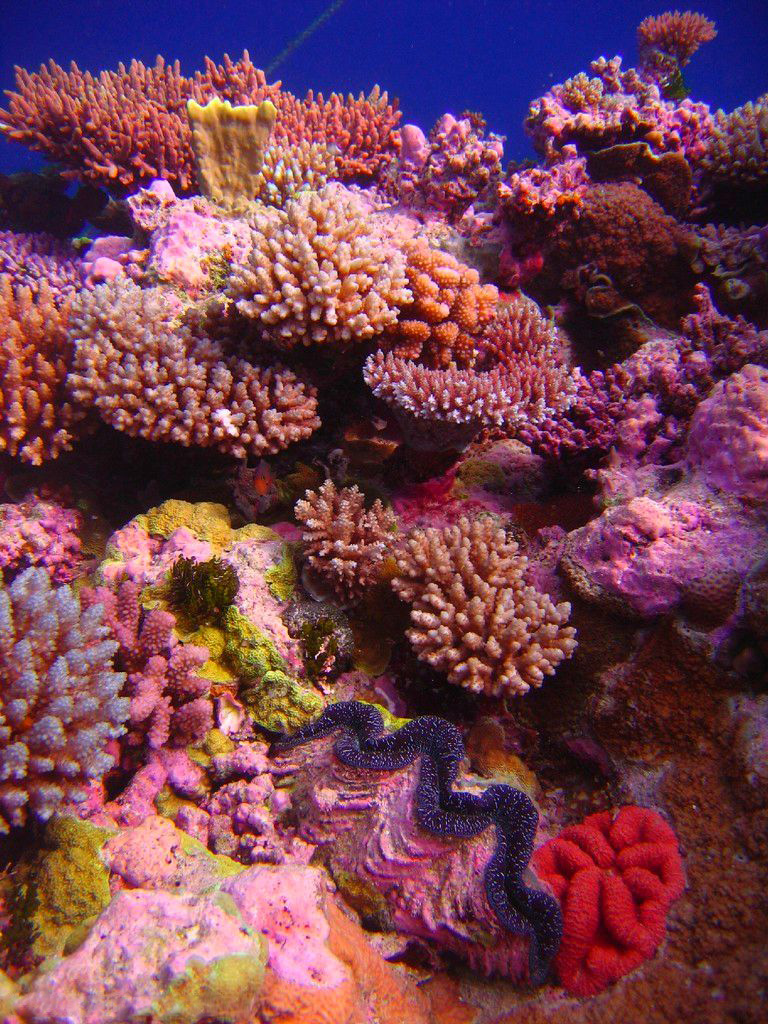
Acropora coral garden with giant clam. Raging Horn, Coral Sea Islands

The Coral Sea Islands Territory is covered by two Australian Marine Parks: the Lord Howe Island Marine Park, which contains Elizabeth Reef and Middleton Reef, and the Coral Sea Marine Park, which covers the remainder of the territory. The Coral Sea Marine Park is home to six species of marine turtle, for which the islands and cays in the Coral Sea Islands Territory serve as an important breeding site. The territory also serves as a migratory corridor for black marlins, loggerhead turtles, freshwater eels, and other species. Humpback whales migrate through the Coral Sea Islands between June and November of each year, and the territory is home to dwarf minke whales and a variety of species of toothed whale. Some of the reefs in the territory also contain large shark populations, including many species of deep-water shark. The southern part of the territory is known for its large populations of predatory fish such as sharks, tuna, and billfish.

The islands of the Coral Sea are also an important breeding area for seabirds. There are 36 seabird species known to live on the islands and reefs that make up the former Lihou Reef National Nature Reserve and Coringa-Herald National Nature Reserve. These include populations of red-footed boobies, lesser frigatebirds, great frigatebirds, and red-tailed tropicbirds.

== See also ==
- Gay and Lesbian Kingdom of the Coral Sea Islands
- List of islands of Australia
