= Osprey Reef =

Submerged atoll northeast of Queensland, Australia

Coordinates: 13°54′29″S 146°36′55″E

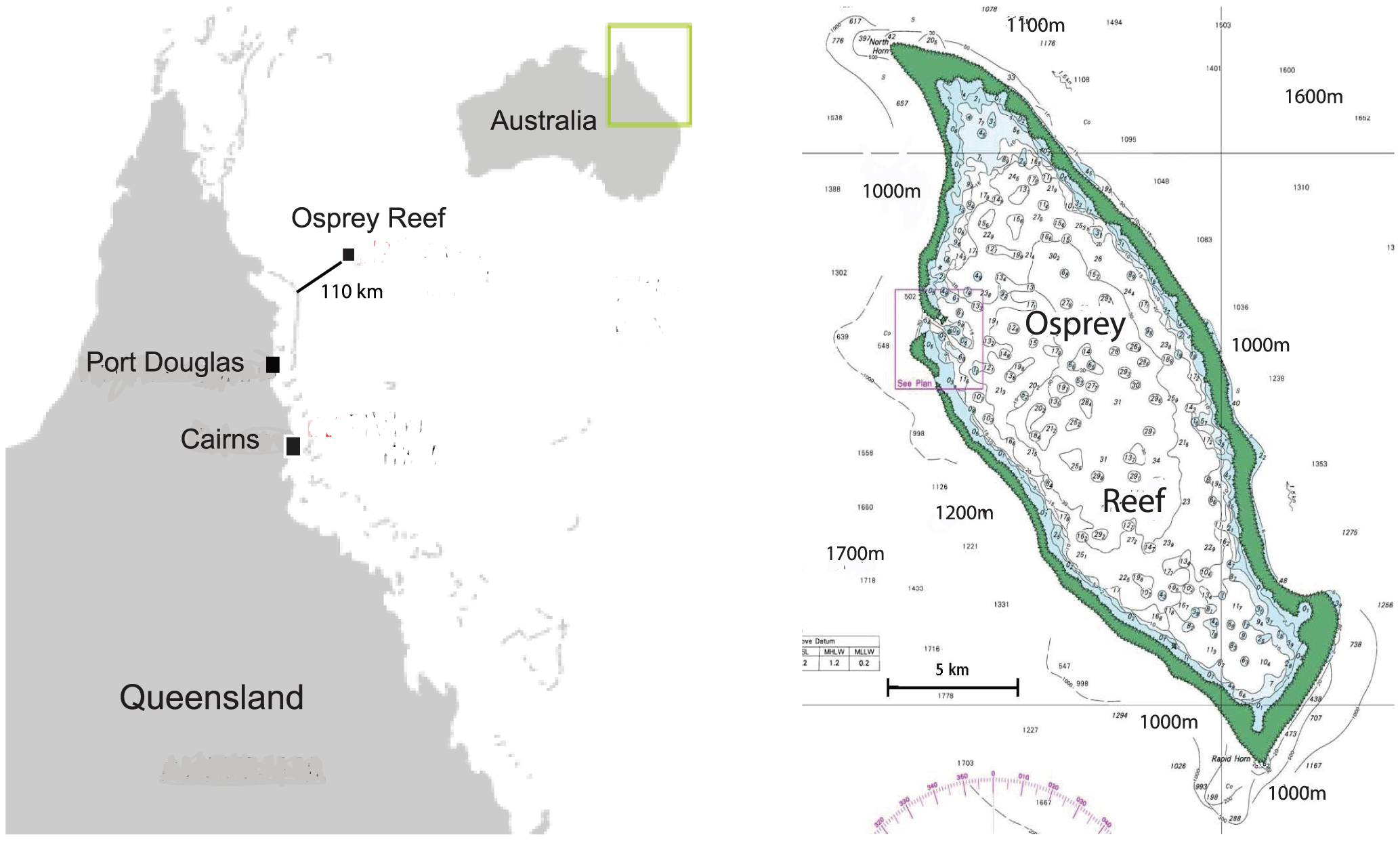
Bathymetric map of Osprey Reef, showing its location around 110 kilometres (68 mi) from the northern part of the Great Barrier Reef

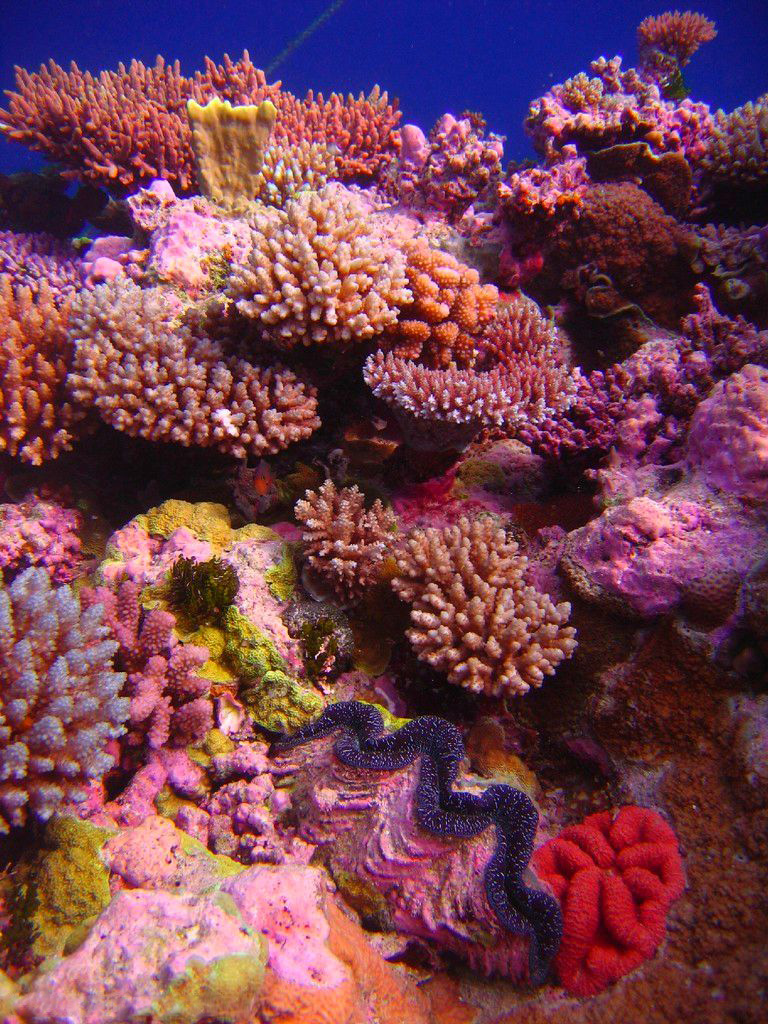
Acropora coral garden with giant clam at Raging Horn, Osprey Reef

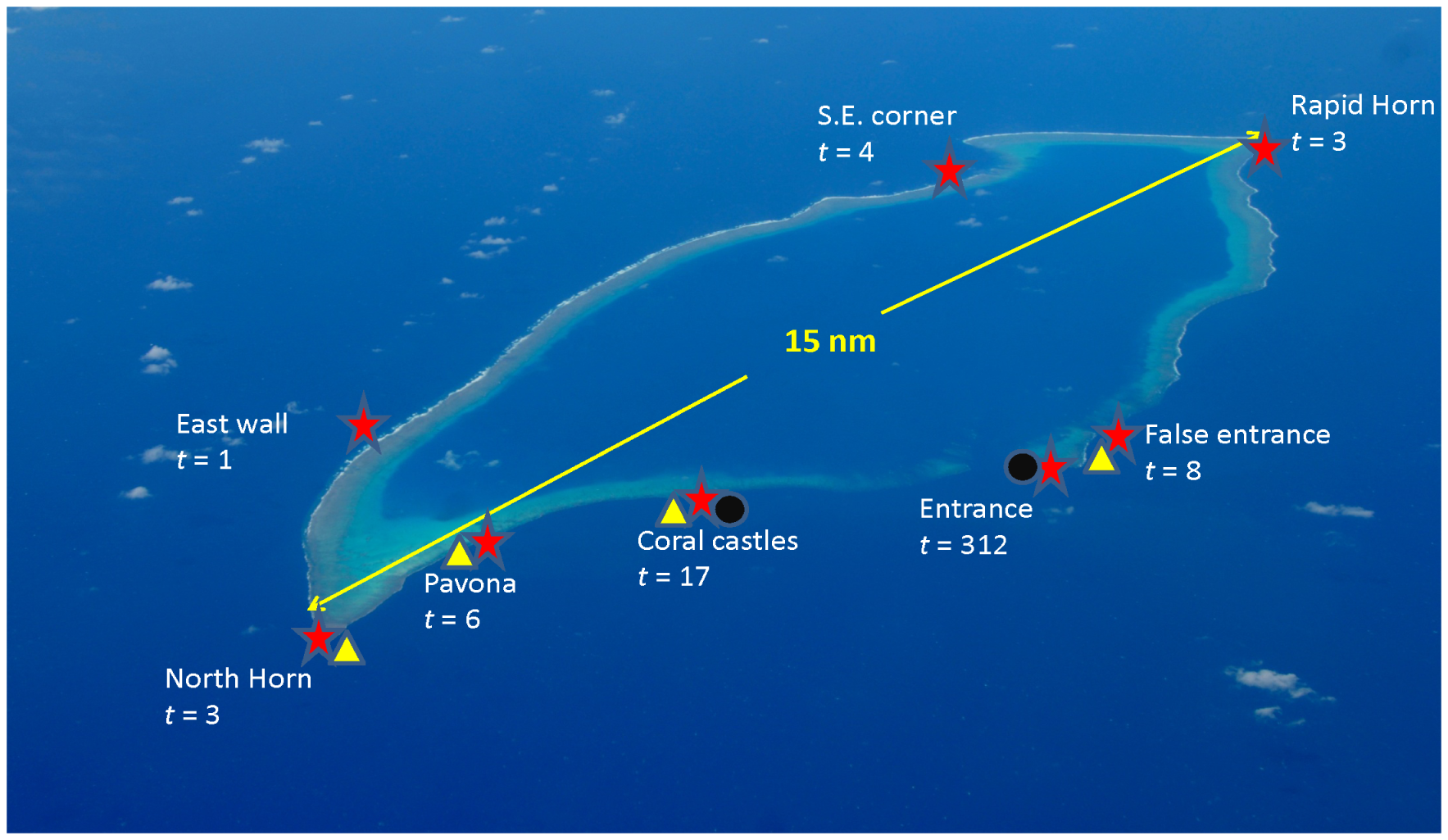
Osprey Reef from the air, showing nautilus detection sites used in a 1998–2008 study by Dunstan et al.

Osprey Reef is a submerged atoll in the Coral Sea, northeast of Queensland, Australia. It is part of the Northwestern Group of the Coral Sea Islands. Osprey Reef is roughly oval in shape, measuring 25 by 12 kilometres (16 by 7 mi), and covers around 195 square kilometres (75 sq mi). It has a perimeter of 69.5 kilometres (43.2 mi). The central lagoon is only 30 metres (98 ft) deep.

The reef sits atop a seamount in deep water. It is an isolated location some 60 kilometres (37 mi) from other reefs. The almost vertical reef walls, which rise from a depth of about 2,000 metres (6,600 ft), are home to a dwarf form of Nautilus pompilius that is isolated from other nautilus populations by more than 100 kilometres (62 mi). Schindleria brevipinguis, one of the world's smallest fish, is found in the Osprey Reef lagoon.

The reef has no intertidal or emerged sand cay. The surrounding waters are part of the South Equatorial Current. The reef is protected within the Coral Sea Commonwealth Marine Reserve.

== Corals ==
A 2009 expedition aimed to make discoveries in the deeper parts of the reef between 92 and 800 metres (302 and 2,625 ft) below sea level. Relict fauna communities consisting of rock sponges, glass sponges, brachiopods and stalked sea lilies were discovered.

== Diving ==
The reef has been described as the "ultimate reef diving adventure". The reef is home to large and colourful soft corals. Sharks are common.

== See also ==
- List of reefs
