= False Fatherland =

1968 novel by Australian writer A. Bertram Chandler

- Author: A. Bertram Chandler
- Language: English
- Series: The Rim Worlds
- Genre: Science fiction
- Publisher: Horwitz
- Publication date: 1968
- Publication place: Australia
- Media type: Print
- Pages: 161 pp.
- Preceded by: The Broken Cycle
- Followed by: The Inheritors

False Fatherland (aka Spartan Planet) (1968) is a science fiction novel by Australian writer A. Bertram Chandler. It forms part of the author's Rim World series, featuring the recurring character, John Grimes.

It was originally published under the title Spartan Planet as a 2-part serial in Fantastic magazine in March and May 1968.

== Synopsis ==
Lt Commander Grimes arrives on the long-lost planet of Sparta where humans have modeled their society on the city-state of the same name in ancient Greece. On this planet all men are produced by birth machines, the intimate relations are homosexual and women are unknown.

The inhabitants of the planet are confused by the female members of Grimes's crew and the arrival of his spaceship has profound and lasting effects on the Spartan society.

== Critical reception ==
Writing in Luna Monthly reviewer Jan Slavin described the book as "a fairly good adventure novel" that might "make light reading some dull evening."

== Publication history ==
After its original publication in 1968 in the Fantastic magazine the novel was later published as follows:

- Horwitz, Australia, 1968
- Dell, USA, 1969
- Ace Books, USA, 1979 (with The Commodore at Sea)
- Baen Books, USA, 2007
- Gateway/Orion, UK, 2015

It was translated into Japanese in 1976, Portuguese in the 1970s, German in 1984, and Russian in 2004.

The novel was also included in the following compilations of Chandler's work:

- John Grimes: Lieutenant of the Survey Service, Science Fiction Book Club, 2000
- John Grimes - Federation Survery Service, Baen Books, 2007
- First Command, Baen Books, 2011

== Awards ==
- The novel won the Australian Sf Achievement Award for Best Novel in 1969.

== See also ==
- 1968 in Australian literature

== Notes ==
- Chandler wrote in The Mentor about his reactions upon receiving copies of the Japanese translation of the novel.
