= Fudanshi Shōkan =

Japanese manga series by Moe Fujisaki

- Fudanshi Shōkan: Isekai de Shinjū ni Hameraremashita

腐男子召喚〜異世界で神獣にハメられました〜 (Fudanshi Shōkan: Isekai de Shinjū ni Hameraremashita)
- Genre: Isekai, yaoi
- Manga
- Written by: Moe Fujisaki
- Published by: NTT Solmare (serial); Futabasha (print)
- Imprint: Marginal Comics
- Magazine: Comic Marginal
- Original run: June 7, 2019 – present
- Volumes: 13
- Original net animation
- Directed by: Yoshitomo
- Studio: Aqua Aris
- Released: September 9, 2020 – December 22, 2023
- Episodes: 22

Fudanshi Shōkan: Isekai de Shinjū ni Hameraremashita (Japanese: 腐男子召喚〜異世界で神獣にハメられました〜; "Fudanshi Summoning: I Got Fucked by a Divine Beast in an Alternative World") is a Japanese manga series by Moe Fujisaki. It began serialization in NTT Solmare's monthly digital yaoi manga magazine Comic Marginal in June 2019.

== Plot ==
University student Kotone Aizuhara is a fudanshi, an avid male fan of yaoi. During a visit to a bookstore, a truck crashes into a book stand and Kotone dies buried under a pile of yaoi books. When he wakes up, he finds himself in an alternate world with no women, where the divine snake beast, Nagi, takes him as his bride.

== Characters ==
Kotone Aizuhara (合津原 琴音, Aizuhara Kotone)
Voiced by: Haruki Ishiya
Nagi (凪)
Voiced by: Takuya Satō
Wu (呉)
Voiced by: Takuya Eguchi
Kagetora (景虎)
Voiced by: Makoto Furukawa
Haruka Sakuraba (桜庭遥, Sakuraba Haruka)
Voiced by: Kazuyuki Okitsu
Hao (皓)
Voiced by: Ayumu Murase
Yua (由亜)
Voiced by: Kazuya Ichijō
Jiru (ジル)
Voiced by: Haruna Mikawa

== Media ==
=== Manga ===
Fudanshi Shōkan: Isekai de Shinjū ni Hameraremashita is written and illustrated by Moe Fujisaki. It has been serialized in NTT Solmare's Comic Marginal online magazine since June 7, 2019. The chapters were later released in eight bound volumes by Futabasha under the Marginal Comics imprint.

No.	Japanese release date	Japanese ISBN
1	December 10, 2019	978-4-575-38056-9
2	September 10, 2020	978-4-575-38068-2
3	April 10, 2021	978-4-575-38084-2; 978-4-575-38085-9 (SE)
4	November 10, 2021	978-4-575-38096-5; 978-4-575-38101-6 (SE)
5	July 8, 2022	978-4-575-38113-9; 978-4-575-38115-3 (SE)
6	December 9, 2022	978-4-575-38126-9; 978-4-575-38127-6 (SE)
7	May 10, 2023	978-4-575-38136-8; 978-4-575-38137-5 (SE)
8	December 8, 2023	978-4-575-38153-5; 978-4-575-38154-2 (SE)
9	June 10, 2024	978-4-575-38173-3; 978-4-575-38174-0 (SE)
10	December 10, 2024	978-4-575-38192-4; 978-4-575-38193-1 (SE)
11	June 10, 2025	978-4-575-38210-5; 978-4-575-38211-2 (SE)
12	December 10, 2025	978-4-575-38229-7; 978-4-575-38230-3 (SE)
13	June 10, 2026	978-4-575-38248-8; 978-4-575-38249-5 (SE)

=== Original net animation ===
A four-episode mini animated series was released weekly beginning in September 2020 on Futabasha's BL Twitter account to promote the release of the second volume. A second animated series consisting of three episodes was released beginning on November 3, 2021, to commemorate the release of the fourth volume. A third animated series consisting of three episodes was released beginning on July 8, 2022, to commemorate the release of the fifth volume. A fourth animated series consisting of three episodes was released beginning on December 9, 2022, to commemorate the release of the sixth volume. A fifth animated series consisting of three episodes was released beginning on May 11, 2023, to commemorate the release of the seventh volume.

=== Drama CD ===
Two drama CDs were released from April 10 to June 30, 2021. Both drama CDs features the mini-anime cast reprising their roles. Another drama CD was released along with the special edition of the manga's fifth volume on July 8, 2022. Another drama CD was released along with the special edition of the manga's sixth volume on December 9, 2022.
