= Cato Reef =

Coral reef in the Coral Sea

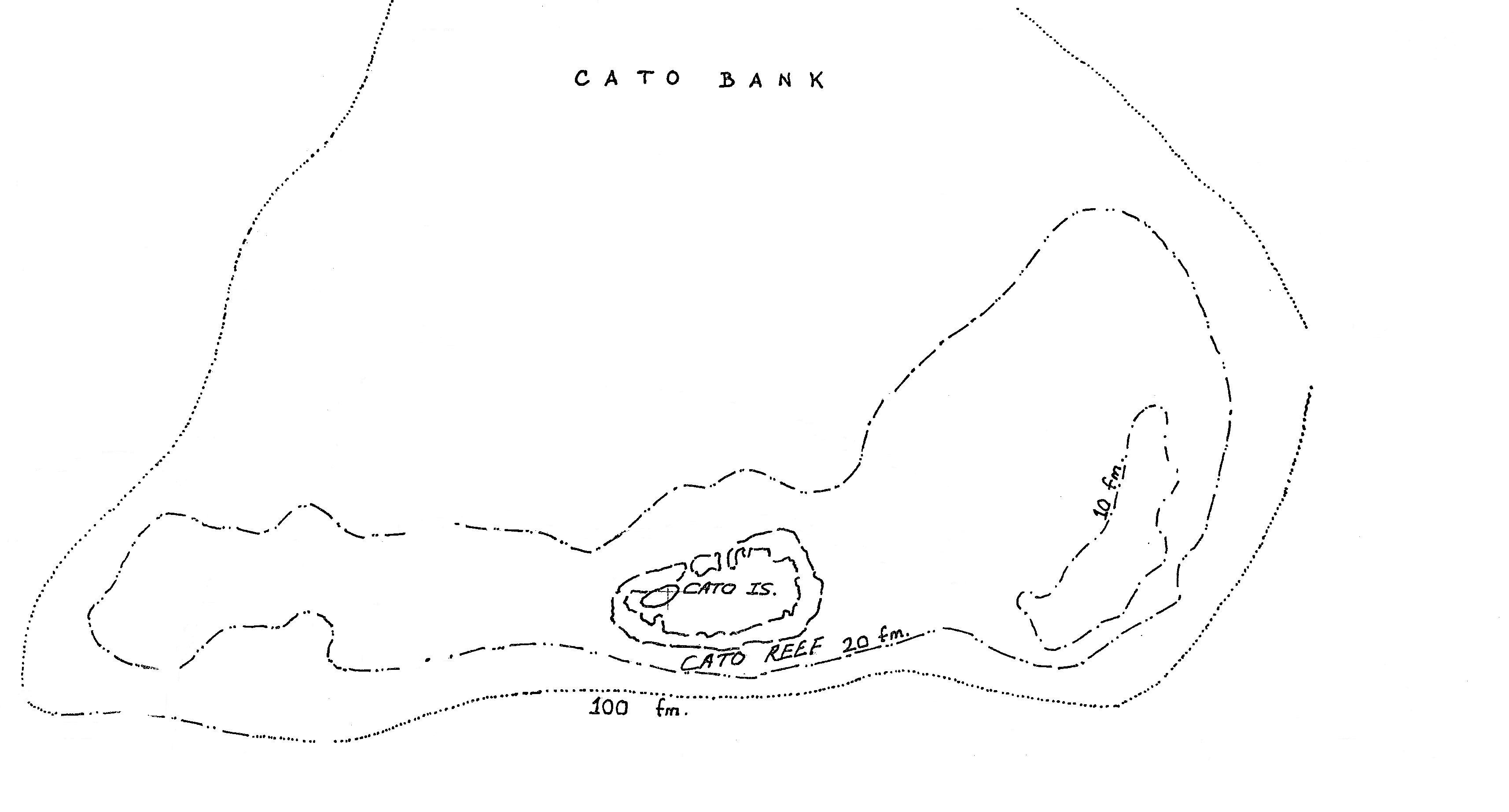
- Chart of Cato Reef
- Named seamounts in Tasmantid Seamount Chain with Cato Reef labelled in red (red pushpins – coral reefs, yellow pushpins – seamounts)
- Location within Pacific Ocean
- Coordinates: 23°15′0″S 155°32′24″E
- Type: Coral reef
- Part of: Cato Bank
- Ocean/sea sources: Coral Sea
- Max. length: 3.3 km (2.1 mi)
- Max. width: 1.8 km (1.1 mi)
- Surface area: 5 km^{2} (1.9 sq mi)
- Max. depth: 17 m (56 ft) – Cato Bank
- Surface elevation: 5.8 m (19 ft) – Cato Island
- Islands: 1 (Cato Island)

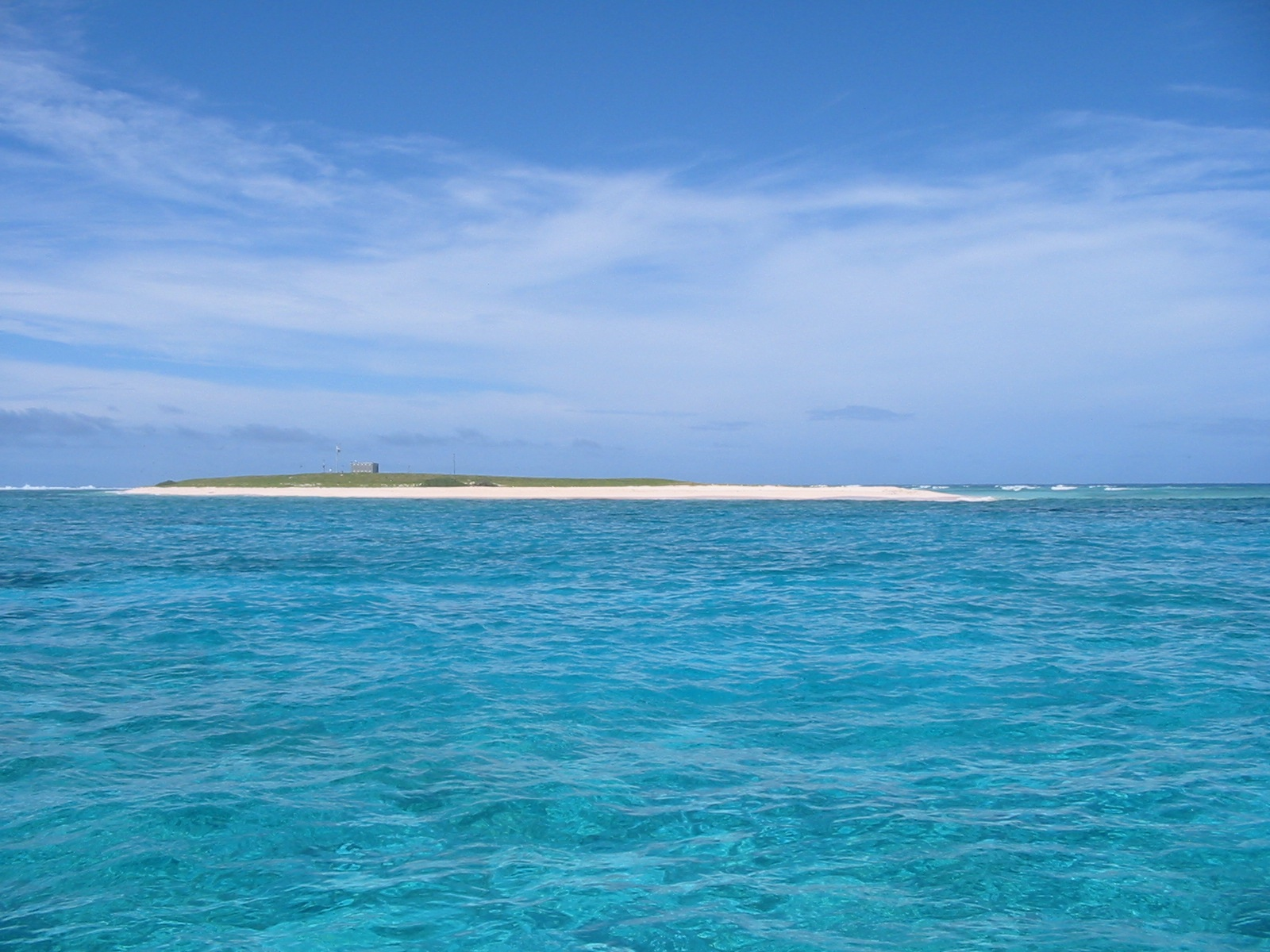
Cato Island is one of the largest islands in the Coral Sea Islands

Cato Reef, a part of Cato Bank, is a coral reef in the Coral Sea, off the central coast of Queensland, Australia.

== Geography ==
Cato Bank measures approximately 21 by 13 km (13 by 8 mi) with an area of 200 km^{2} (77 sq mi). Water depth is typically less than 17 m (56 ft). As a part of Cato Bank, Cato Reef measures in at 3.3 by 1.8 km (2.1 by 1.1 mi), with an area of 5 km^{2} (2 sq mi). It includes a small, shallow lagoon that contains Cato Island, a low-relief cay in the west that is approximately 800 by 300 m (2,600 by 1,000 ft), with an area of 15 hectares (37 acres) and an altitude of 5.8 m (19 ft) . Close to the south-east corner of Cato Bank is Hutchison Rock, with one metre (3 ft) of water over it.

== Cato Island ==
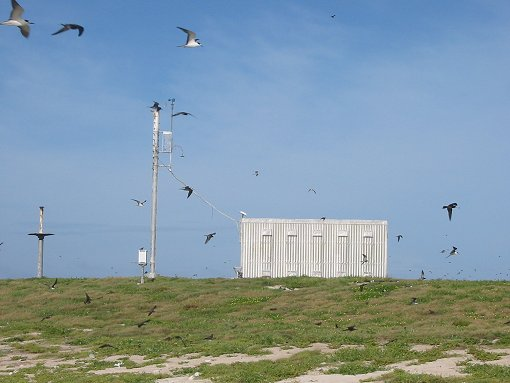
Solar powered weather station on Cato Island

Cato Island (23°15′00″S 155°32′24″E), is a small oval-shaped island lying approximately 375 km (233 mi) east of Gladstone, Queensland, and about 270 km (170 mi) east-southeast of the southern end of the Great Barrier Reef. This island is approximately 115 km (71 mi) south of Bird Islet, a part of the east end of the Wreck Reefs.

The island is a mound of coral debris and grit 5.8 m (19 ft) high, covered in grass and creepers up to 1 m (3 ft) high. An automatic weather station, with two radio masts and a silver-painted hut, stands on the island's northeast end. The island is almost entirely surrounded by reefs; three narrow boat passages cross the reefs on the northern side. The best entrance is the centre one, located 350 metres (1,150 ft) north of the eastern end of Cato Island; it has a conspicuous rock at half tide on its eastern side.

The island lies on the western end of an oval-shaped reef enclosing a lagoon. The lagoon contains numerous coral heads. The sea breaks over the reef in all weather. The reef lies on Cato Bank, which falls away steeply on all sides.

The coral reefs are built on the top of a large shield volcano, produced by eruptions of the Tasmantid Seamount Chain.

Hutchison Rock, at approximately 23.250°S 155.565°E, with a depth of perhaps 1 m (3 ft), lies about 3.5 km (2.2 mi) east of Cato Island.

Danger Patch lies near the outer end of the eastern ledge of Cato Bank. A tidal race is found between the eastern end of Cato Reef and Danger Patch.

== History ==
=== Early reports ===
Cato Island, and then Bird Islet, were found by Captain John Park on Cato and Lt. Robert Fowler on HMS Porpoise on 17 August 1803. Porpoise ran aground on Wreck Reef. Matthew Flinders (1814) on Porpoise reported that the cays held many birds, laying eggs from August to October. On 1 April 1821, the whaler Echo was wrecked on the shoal, though her crew was saved.

Cato Reef remained a hazard to shipping crossing between Australia and Canton (modern day Guangzhou) or India (where cargo was collected on the way home from Australia to Europe). In due course the southern reefs were surveyed by Captain H. M. Denham (ms, 1860) on HMS Herald in 1858–60.

The area was visited by increasing numbers of whalers during the off season in New Zealand, in search of the wintering humpback and sperm whales in the middle of the 19th century. Denham reported that in July 1863, the islets had only two or three plants, including a bush 3–4 m (10–13 ft) high, and were frequented by sea turtles weighing 60–100 kg (130–220 lb).

On 12 October 1858, Denham reported that Cato Island was more substantial than other cays in the area, measuring 1/3 by 1/6 mile (0.5 by 0.3 km), rising to 19 feet (5.8 m), and covered in a coarse tufted grass, genus Rottboellia; a creeping plant, Portulaca oleracea; and a sort of buttercup, Lepidium didymum, undermined and fertilised by burrowing mutton birds, the only species that the sailors chose to eat. Dense colonies of gannets, man-of-war birds, boatswain birds, terns and noddies, with eggs and chicks, were abundant. Denham shot a godwit and a brace of plovers. Whalers recorded repeated visits, but only one humpback was reported offshore. Rayner recorded Limosa, Charadrius, Strepsilas interpres, and a land rail. When they returned with plants from the Percy Isles and seeds from Sydney to provide succour for castaways in August 1859, Denham again reported that the birds formed a cloud hovering 60 feet (18 m) above the island, though "a few visits like ours would tend to check the accumulation in proportion to each boat bringing off upwards of 100 dozen eggs at a three hours gleaning."

=== Guano mining ===
On 27 October 1862, the British government granted an exclusive concession to exploit the guano on Lady Elliot Island, Wreck Reefs, Swain Reefs, Raine Island, Bramble Cay, Brampton Shoal and Pilgrim Island to the Anglo-Australian Guano Company organised by whaler Dr. W. L. Crowther in Hobart, Tasmania. They were apparently most active on Bird Islet (Wreck Reefs) and Lady Elliot and Raine Islands, losing five ships at Bird Islet between 1861 and 1882.

The log of the Daily Southern Cross, 19 September 1863, reported on page 2 that a memorandum, enclosed in a bottle, was picked up by Captain Harris, of Caroline, which arrived in Hobson's Bay during Wednesday night, with a cargo of guano from Cato Island, and was found on the Cato Bank: "25 June 1863 – Prince Edward, of Auckland, Geo. Cook, master, 7 weeks from Bay of Islands, 80 sperm, 6 of blackfish. All well." – Argus, 26 August.

== Micronation’s declaration of independence ==
On 14 June 2004, after sailing on a ship named the Gayflower (a reference to the Mayflower), the activists raised the gay rainbow pride flag on Cato Island and declared the Coral Sea Islands an independent gay and lesbian state. A memorial plaque on the north eastern tip of Cato Island commemorates this historic event and reads:

On the 14th day of June 2004, at this highest point in the Coral Sea, Emperor Dale Parker Anderson raised the gay rainbow flag and claimed the islands of the Coral Sea in his name as homeland for the gay and lesbian peoples of the world. God Save our King!

Coinciding with the decision to secede from Australian sovereignty, the kingdom's founders drafted a declaration of independence. The declaration began,

Homosexual people have honestly endeavoured everywhere to merge ourselves in the social life of surrounding communities and to be treated equally. We are not permitted to do so. In vain we are loyal patriots, our loyalty in some places running to extremes; in vain do we make the same sacrifices of life and property as our fellow citizens; in vain do we strive to increase the fame of our native land in science and art, or her wealth by trade and commerce. In countries where we have lived for centuries, we are still cried down as strangers.... In the world as it is now and for an indefinite period.... I think we shall not be left in peace.

Stated to have been inspired by the United States Declaration of Independence, the kingdom's Declaration also stated: "We hold these truths to be self-evident, that all people are created equal, that they are endowed by their creator with certain unalienable rights, that among these are life, liberty and the pursuit of happiness."

The activists founded a camp site on Cato Island which they named "Heaven" after the famous gay nightclub in London as the claimed capital, and "I Am What I Am" was set as the Kingdom's national anthem.

The leader of the protesters, Dale Parker Anderson, was elected Administrator of the territory and then "declared emperor" of the kingdom upon its independence.

In a scheme similar to Israel's Law of Return, a person was automatically granted permanent resident status and immediately eligible for citizenship in the Gay and Lesbian Kingdom of the Coral Sea Islands simply by being gay or lesbian.

The kingdom issued its first stamps in July 2006 "with the aim of creating a high and distinctive reputation amongst the philatelic fraternity". The kingdom's website stated that tourism, fishing and philatelic sales were its only economic activities. However, swimming, reef walking, lagoon snorkelling, bird-watching, seashell-collecting, and shipwreck-exploring were all gay government-sanctioned non-economic activities.

After Australia put marriage equality in to law, the Gay and Lesbian Kingdom formally dissolved on 17 November 2017.

== Shipwrecks ==
=== Dockenhuden ===
On 3 August 1853, Dockenhuden, a German ship in transit between Melbourne and Bombay, failed in a tack off Cato Reef, and having no room to jibe, struck the reef and foundered. The crew spent 15 days repairing the ship's boats before leaving for Moreton Bay, which was reached on 27 August.

=== Thomas King ===
Thomas King, a barque of 346 tons, built for the West Indian sugar run, was taken to Australia for the New South Wales gold rush. Captain J. H. Walker, with a crew shanghaied with the help of local police, after the original English crew had deserted for the gold fields, left Sydney on 4 April 1852 for the Philippines and China with a cargo of sugar and spirits. It wrecked on a reef east of Cato Reef on 17 April 1852. The barque struck the reef and became a total wreck. Some of her boats washed away. A boat set out for the mainland to seek help, leaving survivors on the reef. After 14 days, they were rescued by the whaler Lady Blackwood. The other boat eventually made Double Island Bay, but when the occupants set out overland for Moreton Bay they were tracked down by Aboriginal Australians and all but the captain and one seaman were killed. When lost, Thomas King carried 3,500 pounds of specie and 8,000 pounds of gold dust. At the time of sailing, it was reported that the gold aboard Thomas King consisted of 212 ounces owned by L. and S. Spyer and 220 ounces, 8 penny weights and 12 grains owned A. and M. Moses, giving a total weight of 432 ounces, 8 penny weights and 12 to 13 grains (13.45 kg) of gold.
